= List of national parks of Western Australia =

National parks in Western Australia

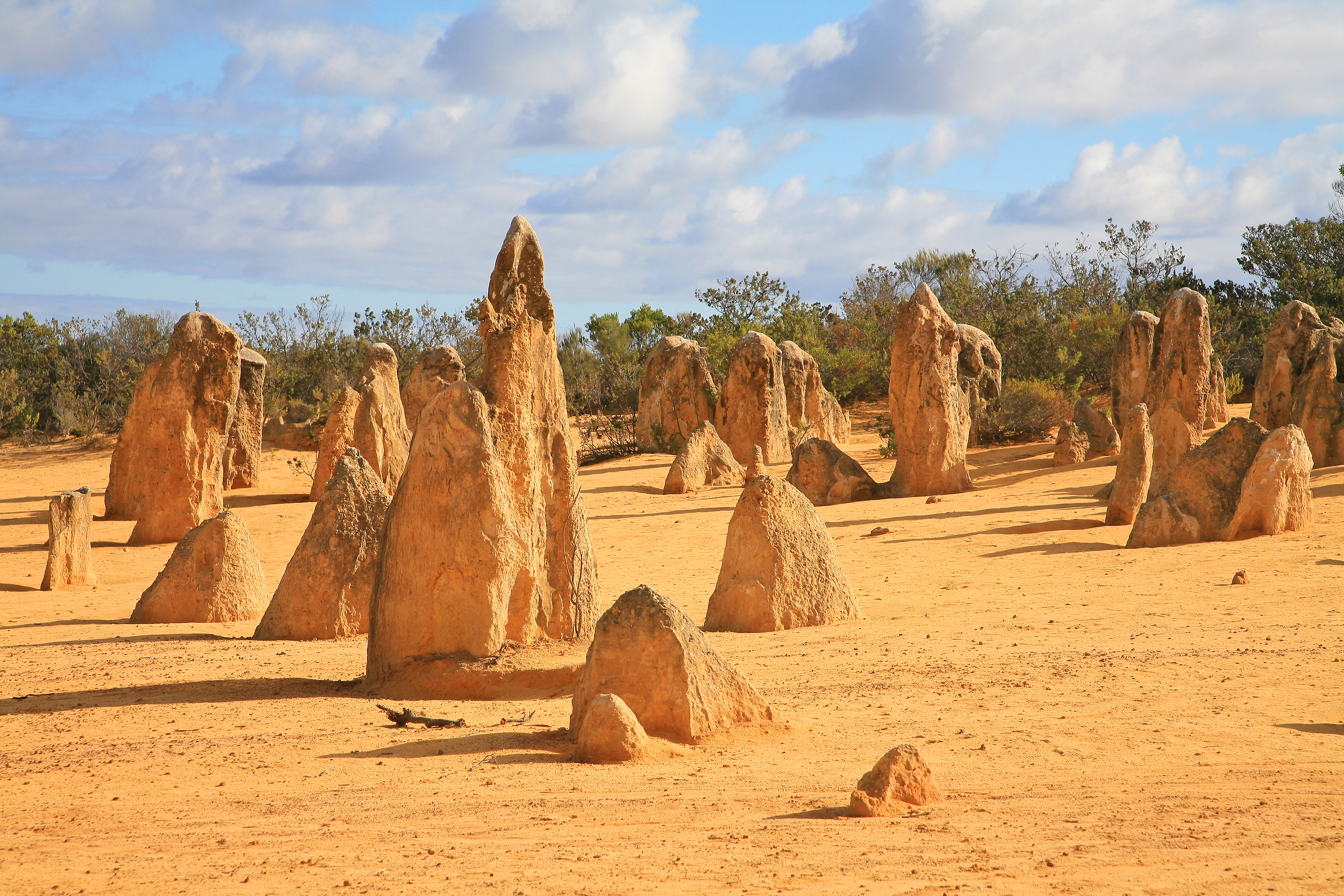
Limestone formations in Nambung national park of Western Australia

Western Australia, as of 2023, has 112 national parks, of which all but four are named. The oldest of these, John Forrest,^{[1]} was proclaimed in 1900 while the latest, Pimbee and Bunuba, were proclaimed in 2023. The largest number of national parks to be proclaimed was in 2004, when 28 parks were created in the state. Just under 2.6 percent of the state of Western Australia is covered by national parks.

The proposed Helena and Aurora Ranges National Park in the Helena and Aurora Range had its first stage of approval completed in October 2022. Another proposed national park in Western Australia is the Edel Land National Park. Steep Point, the most westerly part of the Australian mainland, would be located within the boundaries of the park.

At the time of the last two-yearly Collaborative Australian Protected Areas Database report in 2022, 6,511,458 hectares (16,090,160 acres) of land in Western Australia was covered by national park, which is 8.55 percent of all protected areas in the state. Overall, just over 30 percent of Western Australia is covered by protected areas.

== National parks list ==
Name	IUCN	Gazetted area (hectare)	Declared	Coordinates	IBRA
Alexander Morrison National Park	II	8,499	23 May 1969	30.0493°S 115.5834°E	GES
Avon Valley National Park	II	4,459	7 August 1970	31.6093°S 116.2272°E	JAF
Badgingarra National Park	II	13,105	16 February 1973	30.4351°S 115.4115°E	GES
Beelu National Park	II	4,620	30 November 2004	31.9444°S 116.1478°E	JAF
Blackwood River National Park	II	20,475	30 November 2004	34.0941°S 115.3044°E	JAF
Boorabbin National Park	II	28,168	11 November 1977	31.2549°S 120.1706°E	COO
Boorara-Gardner National Park	II	11,017	8 December 2004	34.7586°S 116.224°E	WAR
Boyndaminup National Park	II	5,443	8 December 2004	34.5136°S 116.5705°E	JAF, WAR
Brockman National Park	II	51	28 January 1927	34.5114°S 115.9996°E	WAR
Bunuba National Park	II	220,000^{[2]}	August 2023	17.9347°S 125.8718°E	CEK, DAL
Cape Arid National Park	II	277,673	22 October 1954	33.5451°S 123.3843°E	COO, ESP, MAL
Cape Le Grand National Park	II	31,199	21 May 1948	33.9541°S 122.205°E	ESP
Cape Range National Park	II	69,488	9 October 1964	22.139°S 113.934°E	CAR
Cape Range (South) National Park	II	27,072	4 November 2020	22.5886°S 113.7251°E	CAR
Collier Range National Park	II	235,223	20 January 1978	24.7529°S 119.1346°E	GAS
D'Entrecasteaux National Park	II	119,004	28 November 1980	34.8737°S 116.3333°E	WAR
Dalgarup National Park	II	2,379	8 December 2004	33.9803°S 115.9843°E	JAF, WAR
Danggu Gorge National Park	II	2,748	20 January 1967	18.0702°S 125.7124°E	DAL
Dirk Hartog Island National Park	II	62,664	28 October 2009	25.7943°S 113.0539°E	YAL
Drovers Cave National Park	II	2,564	19 May 1972	30.2305°S 115.0998°E	SWA
Dryandra Woodland National Park	II	16,536	2 March 2022	32.7833°S 116.9670°E	JAF
Drysdale River National Park	II	447,673	27 September 1974	14.9369°S 127.0777°E	NOK
Easter National Park	II	2,977	8 December 2004	34.2468°S 115.7951°E	JAF, WAR
Eucla National Park	II	3,815	12 October 1979	31.6826°S 128.9578°E	HAM
Fitzgerald River National Park	II	295,706	19 January 1973	33.9874°S 119.5263°E	ESP
Forest Grove National Park	II	1,379	8 December 2004	34.0965°S 115.135°E	JAF, WAR
Francois Peron National Park	II	53,145	8 January 1993	25.7286°S 113.5351°E	CAR
Frank Hann National Park	II	68,708	6 December 1963	32.8922°S 120.3278°E	MAL
Gloucester National Park	II	875	29 January 1993	34.44°S 116.0755°E	WAR
Goldfields Woodlands National Park	II	66,146	14 April 2000	31.2441°S 120.5632°E	COO
Goongarrie National Park	II	60,008	20 October 1978	29.9717°S 121.5097°E	MUR
Gooseberry Hill National Park	II	107	13 February 1970	31.9413°S 116.0469°E	JAF
Greater Beedelup National Park	II	19,287	8 December 2004	34.3747°S 115.8708°E	JAF, WAR
Greater Dordagup National Park	II	6,410	8 December 2004	34.5126°S 116.2694°E	WAR
Greater Hawke National Park	II	14,009	8 December 2004	34.5075°S 115.8704°E	WAR
Greater Kingston National Park	II	21,114	8 December 2004	34.0578°S 116.3631°E	JAF
Greater Preston National Park	II	12,672	8 December 2004	33.5887°S 116.1246°E	JAF
Greenmount National Park	II	202	24 April 1959	31.9109°S 116.0627°E	JAF
Gull Rock National Park	II	2,107	10 January 1964	35.003°S 118.0015°E	JAF
Hassell National Park	II	1,138	8 March 1963	34.6764°S 118.3293°E	ESP, JAF
Helena National Park	II	12,269	30 November 2004	32.155°S 116.3208°E	JAF
Hilliger National Park	II	16,986	30 November 2004	34.2259°S 115.694°E	JAF, WAR
Houtman Abrolhos Islands National Park	II	1,564	5 July 2019	28.4635°S 113.6975°E	GES
Jane National Park	II	6,868	8 December 2004	34.5936°S 116.2454°E	WAR
John Forrest National Park	II	2,700	30 November 1900^{[1]}	31.8698°S 116.0862°E	JAF
Kalamunda National Park	II	397	7 December 1934	31.9597°S 116.076°E	JAF
Kalbarri National Park	II	183,162	22 November 1963	27.6396°S 114.4777°E	GES
Karijini National Park	II	624,428	31 October 1969	22.5626°S 118.3375°E	PIL
Karlamilyi National Park	II	1,283,729	22 April 1977	22.3066°S 122.9112°E	GSD, LSD
Kennedy Range National Park	II	142,275	8 January 1993	24.5797°S 115.051°E	CAR
Korung National Park	II	6,354	30 November 2004	32.0695°S 116.1335°E	JAF
Lake Muir National Park	II	9,636	8 December 2004	34.5594°S 116.7248°E	JAF, WAR
Lakeside National Park	II	8,471	18 February 2021	27.6467°S 117.5152°E	MUR
Lawley River National Park	II	17,319	10 July 2000	14.6914°S 125.9061°E	NOK
Leeuwin-Naturaliste National Park	II	21,600	7 November 1902	34.1691°S 115.0505°E	JAF, WAR
Lesmurdie Falls National Park	II	57	1 February 1946	31.9952°S 116.0309°E	JAF
Lesueur National Park	II	27,231	24 January 1992	30.1326°S 115.1874°E	GES, SWA
Matuwa Kurrara Kurrara National Park	II	609,300^{[2]}	5 May 2023	25°50′40″S 121°40′50″E	GAS^{[2]}
Midgegooroo National Park	II	2,493	30 November 2004	32.1294°S 116.1484°E	JAF
Millstream Chichester National Park	II	238,344	7 November 1969	21.4426°S 117.4841°E	PIL
Milyeannup National Park	II	18,698	30 November 2004	34.1554°S 115.6529°E	JAF
Mirima National Park	II	2,066	13 August 1982	15.7667°S 128.768°E	VIB
Mitchell River National Park	II	115,052	10 July 2000	14.9488°S 125.6096°E	NOK
Moore River National Park	II	17,235	10 March 1967	31.0849°S 115.6839°E	SWA
Mount Augustus National Park	III	9,163	22 September 1989	24.3329°S 116.8506°E	GAS
Mount Frankland National Park	II	37,122	23 December 1988	34.7946°S 116.8199°E	JAF, WAR
Mount Frankland North National Park	II	22,069	8 December 2004	34.6691°S 116.7037°E	JAF, WAR
Mount Frankland South National Park	II	42,299	8 December 2004	34.8507°S 116.5857°E	WAR
Mount Lindesay National Park	II	39,573	8 December 2004	34.813°S 117.3437°E	JAF, WAR
Mount Roe National Park	II	127,800	8 December 2004	34.7119°S 117.0209°E	JAF, WAR
Mungada Ridge National Park	II	1,031	17 January 2022	29.1434°S 116.9098°E	YAL
Murujuga National Park	II	5,137	17 January 2013	20.5652°S 116.8193°E	PIL
Nambung National Park	II	19,390	31 August 1956	30.5897°S 115.1573°E	SWA
Neerabup National Park	II	973	2 July 1965	31.6356°S 115.7182°E	SWA
Niiwalarra Islands National Park	Ia	3,352	4 December 2019	13.8900°S 126.5461°E	NOK
Peak Charles National Park	II	39,953	27 April 1979	32.9086°S 121.1083°E	MAL
Pimbee National Park	II	^{[2]}	August 2023	25.5232°S 114.8718°E	CAR
Porongurup National Park	II	2,686	4 September 1925	34.684°S 117.8957°E	JAF
Prince Regent National Park	II	584,817	10 April 1964	15.5674°S 125.4685°E	NOK
Purnululu National Park	II	243,831	6 March 1987	17.5304°S 128.394°E	OVP
Scott National Park	II	3,322	17 July 1959	34.2423°S 115.2243°E	JAF, WAR
Serpentine National Park	II	4,286	29 March 1968	32.3958°S 116.0668°E	JAF
Shannon National Park	II	52,622	23 December 1988	34.7146°S 116.3858°E	JAF, WAR
Sir James Mitchell National Park	II	173	29 August 1924	34.3455°S 116.1461°E	WAR
Stirling Range National Park	II	113,605	6 June 1913	34.3903°S 117.8968°E	AVW, ESP, JAF
Stokes National Park	II	10,027	21 June 1974	33.8206°S 121.1984°E	ESP
Tathra National Park	II	4,322	23 May 1969	29.78°S 115.5306°E	GES
Torndirrup National Park	II	4,021	9 September 1955	35.0981°S 117.871°E	WAR
Tuart Forest National Park	II	1,410	16 October 1987	33.5693°S 115.5049°E	SWA
Tunnel Creek National Park	II	91	19 July 1963	17.6107°S 125.144°E	CEK, DAL
Unnamed WA17519 National Park	II	132	3 September 1920	34.4728°S 115.9314°E	WAR
Unnamed WA46400 National Park	II	1,571	13 December 2000	34.1005°S 115.1788°E	JAF
Unnamed WA47688 National Park	II	81	26 July 2004	33.2006°S 116.2704°E	JAF
Unnamed WA53843 National Park	II	548	17 February 2021	34.3998°S 115.6528°E	WAR
Warlibirri National Park	II	15,895	22 September 2021	18.2572°S 126.3598°E	CEK, DAL
Walpole-Nornalup National Park	II	18,545	30 September 1910	35.0262°S 116.6567°E	WAR
Walyunga National Park	II	1,814	8 June 1893^{[1]}	31.721°S 116.0673°E	JAF
Wandoo National Park	II	46,368	30 November 2004	32.0671°S 116.4964°E	JAF
Warren National Park	II	2,991	15 March 1901	34.5045°S 115.9645°E	WAR
Watheroo National Park	II	44,482	8 July 1955	30.2093°S 115.8838°E	GES, SWA
Waychinicup National Park	II	3,975	3 March 1961	34.894°S 118.3726°E	ESP, JAF
Wellington National Park	II	24,799	4 July 2000	33.3802°S 115.9589°E	JAF
West Cape Howe National Park	II	3,671	9 February 1962	35.0927°S 117.5972°E	WAR
Whicher National Park	II	6,354	8 December 2004	33.7836°S 115.4875°E	JAF, SWA
William Bay National Park	II	1,746	23 April 1909	35.0136°S 117.2449°E	WAR
Wiltshire-Butler National Park	II	11,649	30 November 2004	34.0371°S 115.4915°E	JAF
Windjana Gorge National Park	II	2,081	10 December 1971	17.4175°S 124.9774°E	CEK, DAL
Wolfe Creek Meteorite Crater National Park	III	1,455	15 November 1968	19.1723°S 127.7956°E	OVP
Wooditjup National Park	II	3,892	8 December 2004	33.9318°S 115.1221°E	JAF, WAR
Yalgorup National Park	II	14,123	5 February 1909	32.7527°S 115.6522°E	SWA
Yanchep National Park	II	2,860	25 August 1905	31.5368°S 115.6817°E	SWA
Yelverton National Park	II	728	8 December 2004	33.7475°S 115.0808°E	JAF

=== Notes ===
- ^[1] John Forrest National Park is considered to be Western Australia's oldest national park, declared on 30 November 1900. Despite this, Walyunga National Park is officially stated as having been declared on 8 June 1893.
- ^[2] National parks were created after the 2022 Collaborative Australian Protected Areas Database report, limited or incomplete information available at this point.

=== Key for IBRA ===
Interim Biogeographic Regionalisation for Australia:

- AVW: Avon Wheatbelt
- CAR: Carnarvon xeric shrublands
- CEK: Central Kimberley
- COO: Coolgardie bioregion
- DAL: Dampierland
- ESP: Esperance Plains
- GAS: Gascoyne bioregion
- GES: Geraldton Sandplains
- GSD: Great Sandy Desert
- HAM: Hampton bioregion
- JAF: Jarrah Forest
- LSD: Little Sandy Desert
- MAL: Mallee bioregion
- MUR: Murchison (Western Australia)
- NOK: Northern Kimberley
- OVP: Ord Victoria Plain
- PIL: Pilbara shrublands
- SWA: Swan Coastal Plain
- VIB: Victoria Bonaparte
- WAR: Warren bioregion
- YAL: Yalgoo bioregion

== See also ==
- List of named nature reserves of Western Australia
- List of unnamed nature reserves of Western Australia
- List of conservation parks of Western Australia
- List of Indigenous Protected Areas of Western Australia
