= Lakeside, Western Australia =

Lakeside, Western Australia may refer to:

- Lakeside Joondalup shopping centre Joondalup, Western Australia
- Lakeside Lightning, a basketball club based in Perth, Western Australia
- Lakeside National Park, a national park in the Mid West region of Western Australia
- Former name of Elleker, Western Australia
- Former name of Lakewood, Western Australia
