= Dimond Gorge =

Gorge on the Fitzroy River in Western Australia

Coordinates: 17°39′02″S 126°01′32″E

Dimond Gorge is a gorge on the Fitzroy River, Western Australia, within Mornington Sanctuary.

== Features ==
=== Fauna ===
The Short-eared rock-wallaby is a known inhabitant of Dimond Gorge.

=== River level gauging ===
The Department of Water maintain an operating gauging station in the gorge and the current river level can be ascertained here

== History ==
Dimond Gorge was considered as a location for the peaceful use of nuclear explosions in the 1960s.

There have been several proposals to dam the Fitzroy River at Dimond Gorge to serve as a water source for agriculture in Kimberley and as a source for Perth.

In 2023, the Bunuba National Park was established, which stretches from Dimond Gorge to Geikie Gorge including the Danggu Gorge National Park.
