= Warren bioregion =

Biogeographic region in southern Western Australia

Warren bioregion Jarrah-Karri forest and shrublands
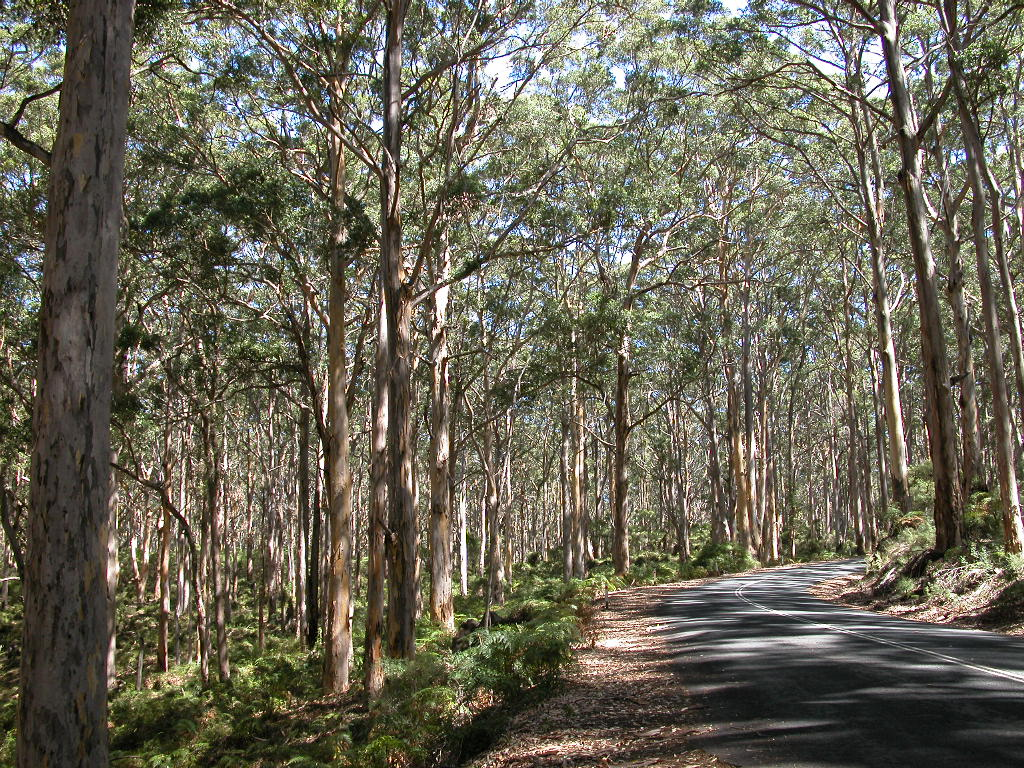
- Karri forest near Pemberton, Western Australia

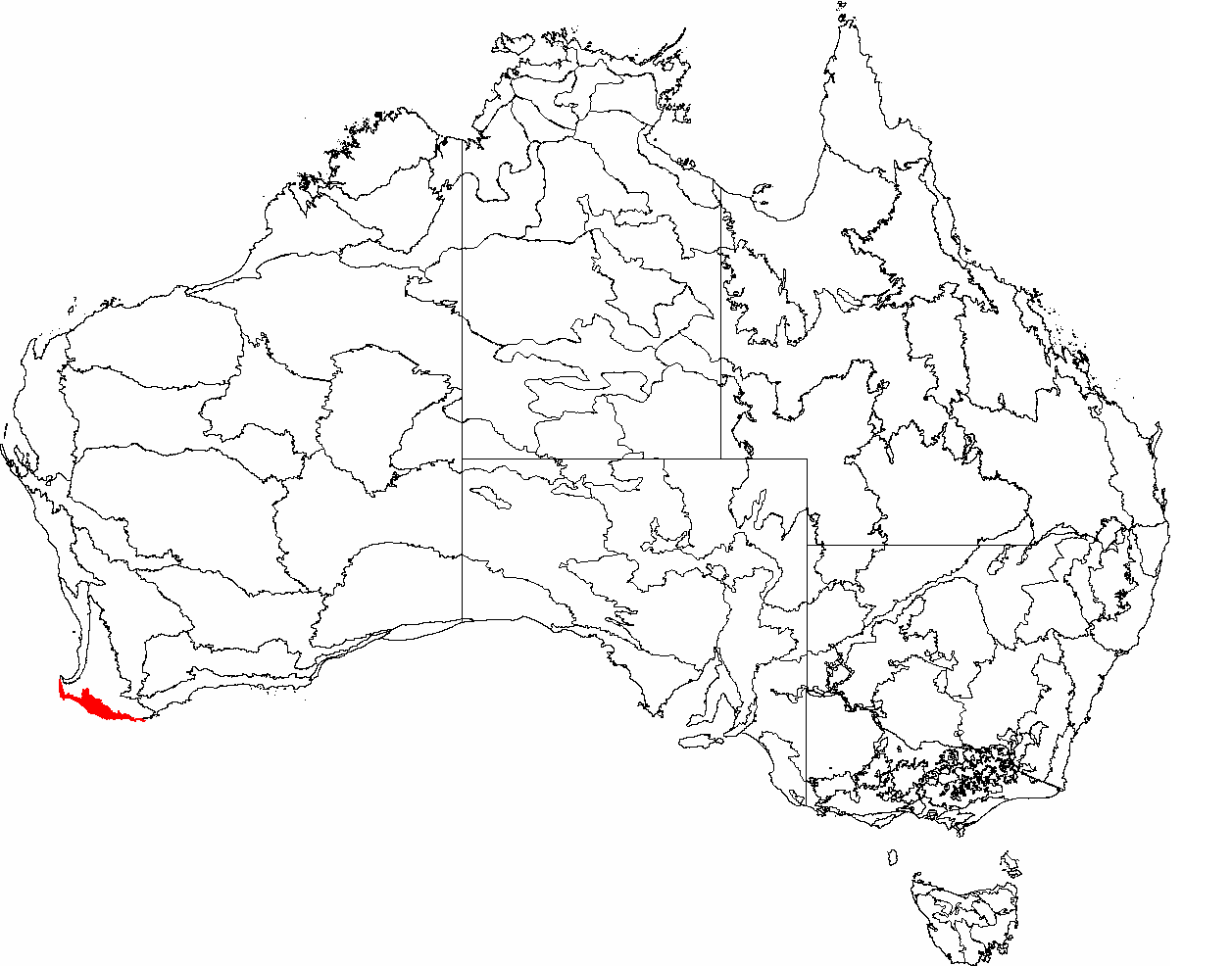
- The IBRA regions, with Warren in red

Ecology
- Realm: Australasian
- Biome: Mediterranean forests, woodlands, and scrub
- Borders: Karri Forest (Southwest Australia woodlands)

Geography
- Area: 8,273 km^{2} (3,194 sq mi)
- Country: Australia
- State: Western Australia
- Coordinates: 34.6°S 116.1°E

Conservation
- Conservation status: Critical/endangered
- Protected: 3,871 km² (47%)

Warren, also known as Karri Forest Region and the Jarrah-Karri forest and shrublands ecoregion, is a biogeographic region in southern Western Australia. Located in the southwest corner of Western Australia between Cape Naturaliste and Albany, it is bordered to the north and east by the Jarrah Forest region. Its defining characteristic is an extensive tall forest of Eucalyptus diversicolor (karri). This occurs on dissected, hilly ground, with a moderately wet climate. Karri is a valuable timber and much of the karri forest has been logged over, but less than a third has been cleared for agriculture. Recognised as a region under the Interim Biogeographic Regionalisation for Australia (IBRA), and as a terrestrial ecoregion by the World Wide Fund for Nature, it was first defined by Ludwig Diels in 1906.

== Geography and geology ==
The Warren region is defined as the coastal sandplain between Cape Naturaliste and Albany. Extending from the ocean to the edge of the Yilgarn craton plateau, for most of its extent it may be adequately approximated as the land within ten kilometres (6.2 miles) of the coast. North of Point D'Entrecasteaux, however, it extends inland almost as far as Nannup and Manjimup. It has an area of about 8,300 square kilometres (3,200 sq mi), making it about 2.7% of the South West Province, 0.3% of the state, and 0.1% of Australia. It is bounded to the north and east by the Jarrah Forest region. Much of the region is unpopulated, but there are a number of towns with substantial populations, most notably Margaret River, Augusta, Pemberton, Walpole, Denmark and Albany.

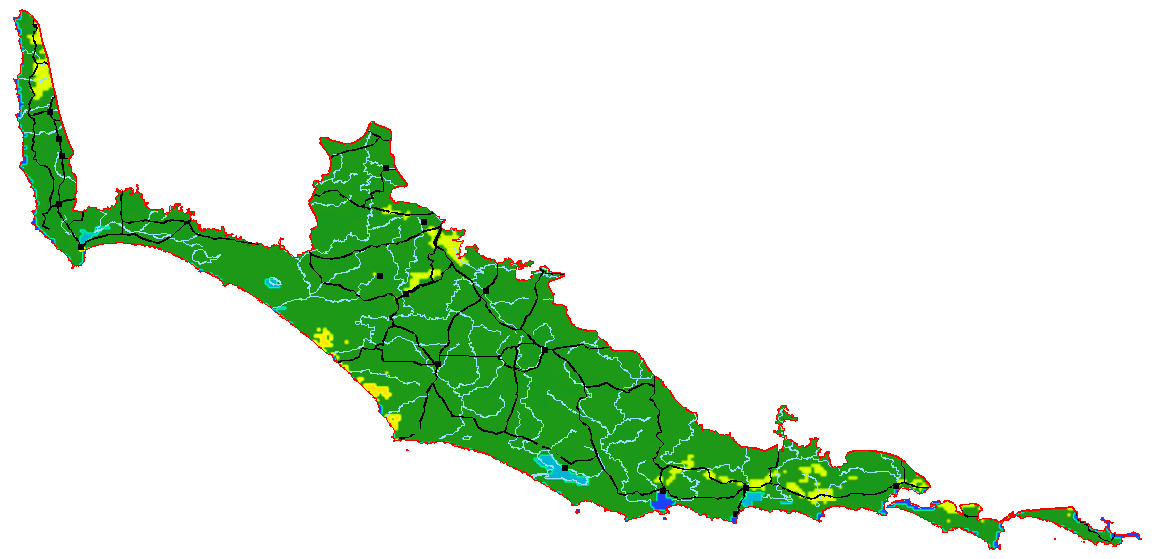
The Warren region, with agricultural areas in yellow, and native vegetation in green.

Warren has a hilly topography, caused by two factors: the underlying geology, which consists of infolded metamorphic rock of the Leeuwin Complex and Archaean granite of the Albany-Fraser Orogen; and the dissection of rivers such as the Blackwood, Warren, Shannon and Frankland. The western extent of the region takes in the Leeuwin-Naturaliste Ridge, an 80 kilometres (50 miles) long strip of coastal limestone on top of a ridge of granite, with an extensive cave system. There are a number of soil types, including hard setting loamy soil, lateritic soil, leached sandy soil and Holocene marine dunes.

== Climate ==
Warren has a moderate Mediterranean climate. It has the highest rainfall in the state, with annual falls of from 650 to 1,500 millimetres (26 to 59 inches), and a short dry season of only three to four months.

Climatic Table for Pemberton, a town in the Warren region
	Jan	Feb	Mar	Apr	May	Jun	Jul	Aug	Sep	Oct	Nov	Dec	Year
Mean daily maximum temperature	26.1 °C; 79.0 °F	26.3 °C; 79.3 °F	24.3 °C; 75.7 °F	21.1 °C; 70.0 °F	18.0 °C; 64.4 °F	15.8 °C; 60.4 °F	14.9 °C; 58.8 °F	15.3 °C; 59.5 °F	16.6 °C; 61.9 °F	18.6 °C; 65.5 °F	21.2 °C; 70.2 °F	23.8 °C; 74.8 °F	20.2 °C; 68.4 °F
Mean daily minimum temperature	13.1 °C; 55.6 °F	13.5 °C; 56.3 °F	12.6 °C; 54.7 °F	10.9 °C; 51.6 °F	9.3 °C; 48.7 °F	8.1 °C; 46.6 °F	7.2 °C; 45.0 °F	7.0 °C; 44.6 °F	7.6 °C; 45.7 °F	8.5 °C; 47.3 °F	10.2 °C; 50.4 °F	11.9 °C; 53.4 °F	10.0 °C; 50.0 °F
Mean total rainfall	21.7 mm 0.8 in	20.0 mm 0.8 in	37.3 mm 1.5 in	74.3 mm 2.9 in	153.3 mm 6.0 in	196.9 mm 7.8 in	214.5 mm 8.4 in	169.4 mm 6.7 in	125.6 mm 4.9 in	92.3 mm 3.6 in	59.6 mm 2.3 in	34.5 mm 1.4 in	1199.5 mm 47.2 in
Mean number of rain days	6.7	6.5	8.8	12.8	18.1	21.2	22.9	21.6	18.8	16.0	12.2	9.4	175.0
Source: Bureau of Meteorology

== Vegetation and flora ==
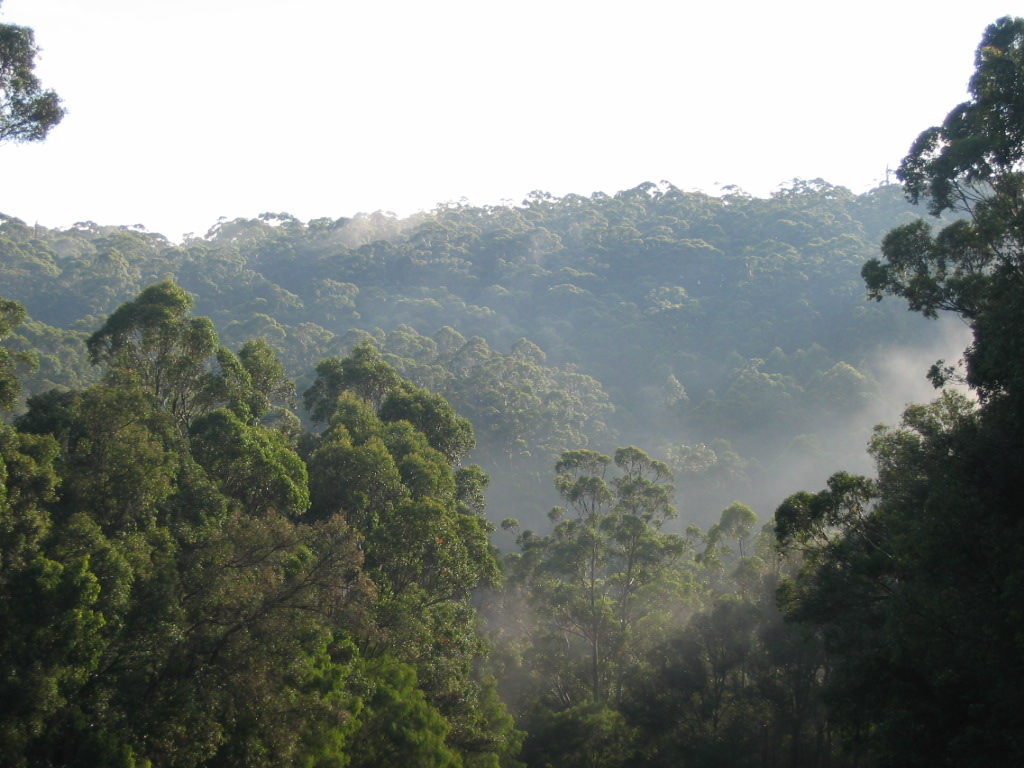
Karri forest near Pemberton, showing typical hilly topography.

The characteristic vegetation of the Warren region is the karri (Eucalyptus diversicolor), at 90m the tallest trees in Australia, in association with the three tingle trees, which are endemic to this coast: rates tingle (E. brevistylis), red tingle (E. jacksonii) and yellow tingle (E. guilfoylei). Karri has a thick undergrowth of flowers and shrubs such as coral vine (Kennedia coccinea). The most important plant families are Fabaceae (including the colourful wisteria, Hardenbergia comptoniana), Orchidaceae, Mimosaceae, Myrtaceae and Proteaceae.

The karri forest occurs in deep loam, and covers nearly half of the region. Although very moist in winter, it is not considered to be a rainforest because the dry season precludes the establishment of a characteristic rainforest understory of epiphytes, liverworts, ferns and mosses. Some rainforest relict species do occur, however, such as Anthocercis sylvicola, Albany pitcher plant (Cephalotus follicularis) and wild plum (Podocarpus drouynianus).

The poorer, lateritic soils, about a quarter of the region, are vegetated by medium forest of jarrah (Eucalyptus marginata), which can grow up to 40m tall, and marri (Corymbia calophylla) (up to 60m). Other significant vegetation forms include low woodland of E. marginata and Banksia species (8%); Agonis flexuosa woodlands or scrub on Holocene marine dunes (5%); and swamps supporting sedges (5%) or low woodlands of Melaleuca (4%).

As of 2007, the Warren is known to contain 1865 indigenous vascular plant species, and a further 419 naturalised alien species. The endangered flora of the Warren region consists of 28 species, with a further 160 species having been declared Priority Flora under the Department of Environment and Conservation's Declared Rare and Priority Flora List.

The region is considered one of the most important centres of plant endemism in the South West. As well as the three tingle trees other species endemic to the region include Corymbia ficifolia (red flowering gum). The area around Albany is especially rich in endemics such as Cephalotus follicularis.

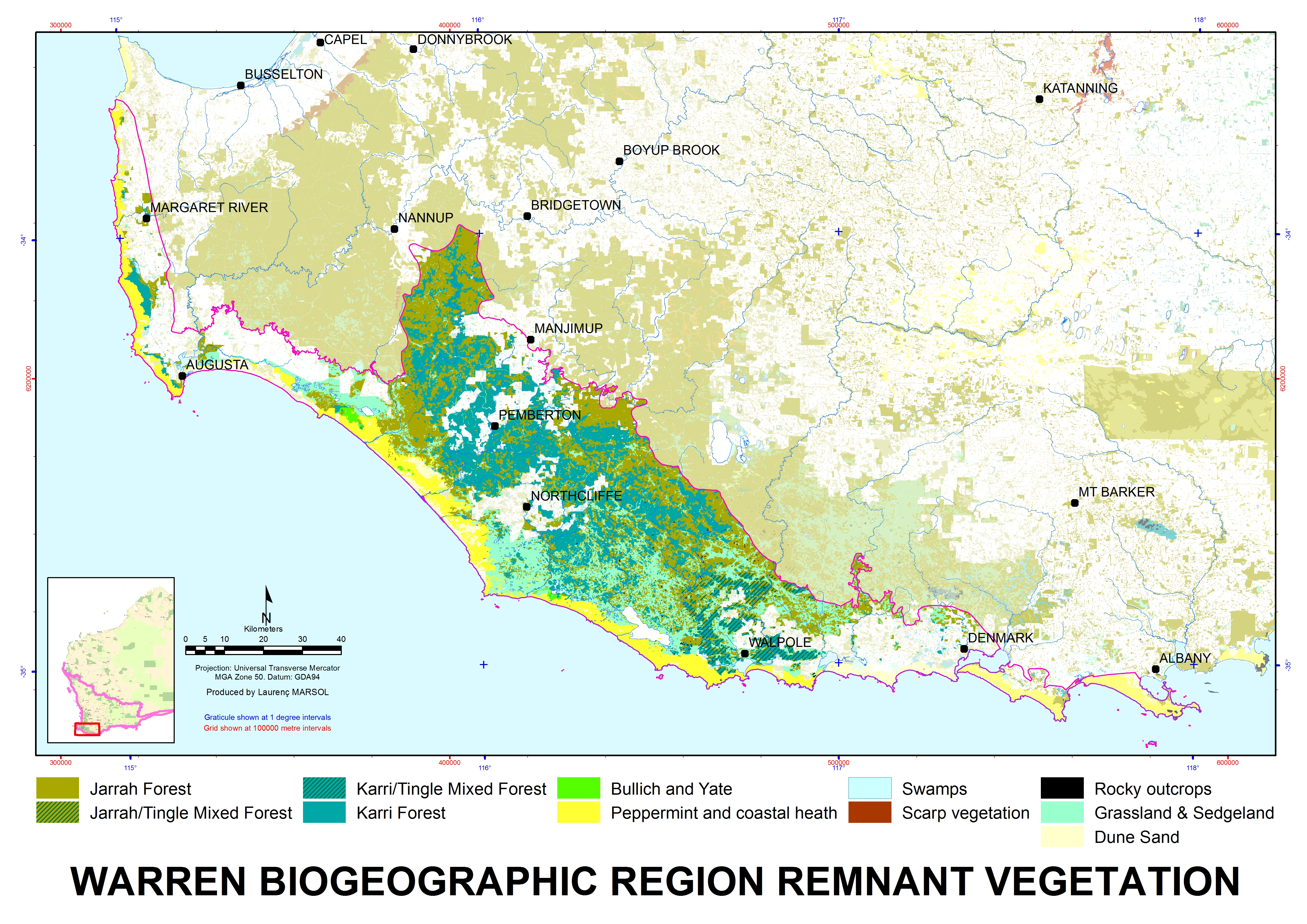
The Warren ecoregion, with main native remnant vegetation from Forest Ecosystem's Parks & Wildlife corporate data.

== Fauna ==
The Warren region supports a rich diversity of fauna, much of which is apparently Gondwanan in origin. Mammal species include the western ringtail possum (Pseudocheirus occidentalis), chuditch (Dasyurus geoffroii) (particularly found in Jarrah forest), the squirrel-like brush-tailed phascogale (Phascogale tapoatafa), quokka (Setonix brachyurus), yellow-footed antechinus (Antechinus flavipes leucogaster), southern brown bandicoot (Isoodon obesulus), and woylie (Bettongia penicillata ogilbyi). The first four of these are endangered species and numbers of many of the indigenous marsupials have declined as their habitats are removed and altered.

As with the rest of southwest Australia, in contrast to comparable forest of the south east, there is a low diversity of bird species. Endemism is similarly low, as most South West bird species are habitat generalists with wide distributions. Exceptions include the red-eared firetail (Stagonopleura oculata) and the white-breasted robin (Eopsaltria georgiana), both of which occur only in the karri forest; the western bristlebird (Dasyornis longirostris), western whipbird (Psophodes nigrogularis nigrogularis) and western ground parrot (Pezoporus wallicus flaviventris), all of which inhabit the region's heath vegetation; and the noisy scrub-bird (Atrichornis clamosus), which inhabits densely vegetated gullies. Other forest birds include the purple-crowned lorikeet.

Insects include an endemic spider Moggridgea tingle.

The freshwater streams of the Warren region support only a low diversity of fauna, but much of it is highly endemic. A number of frog species are endemic or nearly so, including the orange-bellied frog (Geocrinia vitellina), the white-bellied frog (Geocrinia alba), and the sunset frog (Spicospina flammocaerulea). Endemic freshwater invertebrates include worms of the family Phreodrilidea, and crayfish of the genera Cherax and Engaewa.

== Land use ==
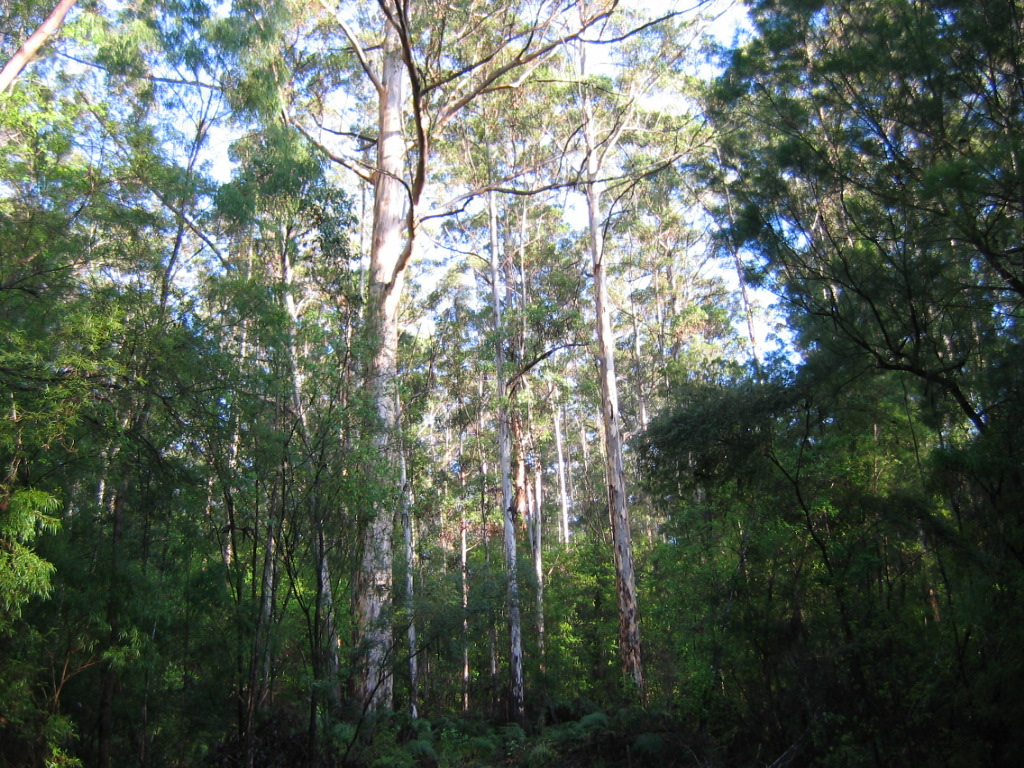
Karri forest near Pemberton. This forest is recovering from extensive logging, and most trees pictured are quite young.

The Warren region falls entirely within what the Department of Agriculture and Food calls the "Intensive Land-use Zone" (ILZ), the area of Western Australia that has been largely cleared and developed for intensive agriculture such as cropping and livestock production. Despite this, only a small amount of the region's natural vegetation has been cleared and given over to agriculture. The proportion of cleared land was calculated as 13.2% in 2002, although Beard gave a much larger figure of 31% in 1984. The remaining land is considered to be native vegetation, but this need not be pristine; a substantial proportion of the remaining native vegetation has been degraded by selective logging and other human activities.

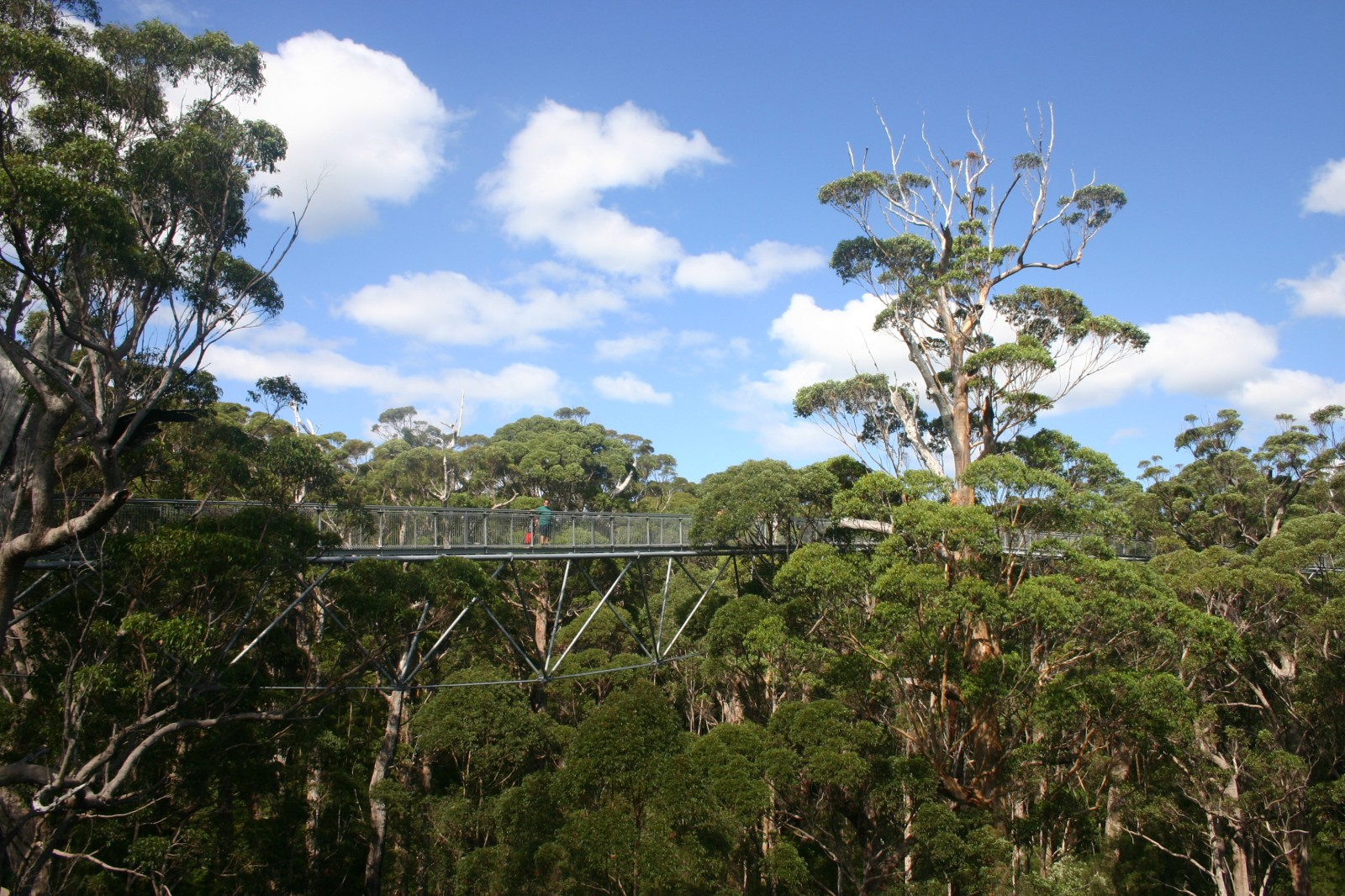
The Tree Top Walk in the Valley of the Giants

Historically, logging was the primary land use in the region, and this remains a significant industry. There has been substantial selective logging in the region, and some clearfelling. There has also previously been some bauxite mining in the area, but this has now ceased, and the mining areas are at least partially reforested. Dams have also been constructed in high-rainfall forest areas.

The most important land uses for the region are now biodiversity conservation and tourism. More than half of the remaining vegetation is now in protected areas, including Shannon National Park, D'Entrecasteaux National Park, Mount Frankland National Park, Leeuwin-Naturaliste National Park and Walpole-Nornalup National Park. These contain numerous tourist attractions, most notably the Walpole-Nornalup National Park's Valley of the Giants, which includes a "Tree Top Walk".

== Conservation ==
The main threat to the biodiversity of the Warren region is the South West's epidemic of dieback, a disease caused by the introduced plant pathogen Phytophthora cinnamomi. Introduced animals such as feral cats, foxes and rats prey on native wildlife and occupy ecological niches to the detriment of native species. Populations are controlled through 1080 baiting as part of the highly successful Western Shield program. Other threats include human activities related to infrastructure and silviculture, such as roads changing surface runoff patterns, and changes to the fire regime.

Because so much of the Warren region is already protected, it has low priority under Australia's National Reserve System.

== Protected areas ==
45.47% of the ecoregion is classified as a terrestrial protected area. Terrestrial connectivity is rated at 42.5%. Protected areas include:

- Boorara-Gardner National Park
- Boyndaminup National Park
- Bramley National Park
- Brockman National Park
- D'Entrecasteaux National Park
- Easter National Park
- Forest Grove National Park
- Gloucester National Park
- Greater Beedelup National Park
- Greater Dordagup National Park
- Greater Hawke National Park
- Hilliger National Park
- Jane National Park
- Leeuwin-Naturaliste National Park
- Mount Frankland National Park
- Mount Frankland North National Park
- Mount Frankland South National Park
- Mount Lindesay National Park
- Mount Mason Nature Reserve
- Mount Roe National Park
- Mount Shadforth Nature Reserve
- Sir James Mitchell National Park
- Scott National Park
- Shannon National Park
- Torndirrup National Park
- Two Peoples Bay Nature Reserve
- Walpole-Nornalup National Park
- Warren National Park
- West Cape Howe National Park
- William Bay National Park

== Biogeography ==
The Warren region first appeared in Ludwig Diels' 1906 biogeographical regionalisation of Western Australia. Diels' concept of Warren region was effectively all the land south of a line from Albany to Busselton; thus it included a substantial area east of Margaret River that is now part of the Jarrah Forest region. The region was not recognised as one of Edward de Courcy Clarke's "natural regions" in 1926, but was resurrected in Charles Gardner's regionalisations of the 1940s and 1950s.

In 1980, John Stanley Beard published a phytogeographical regionalisation of the state based on data from the Vegetation Survey of Western Australia. This new regionalisation included a "Warren Botanical District" that is essentially identical with the present-day Warren. By 1984, Beard's phytogeographic regions were being presented more generally as "natural regions", and as such were given more widely recognisable names. Thus the "Warren Botanical District" became the "Karri Forest Region".

When the IBRA was published in the 1990s, Beard's regionalisation was used as the baseline for Western Australia. The Warren region was accepted as defined by Beard, but reverted to the name "Warren". It has since survived a number of revisions. When the IBRA subregions were introduced in IBRA Version 6.1, the whole of Warren was defined as a single subregion.

Under the World Wildlife Fund's biogeographic regionalisation of the world's terrestrial surface into "ecoregions", the Warren region is equivalent to the Jarrah-Karri forest and shrublands ecoregion of the Mediterranean forests, woodlands, and scrub biome.
