= Dalgarup National Park =

National park in Western Australia

- Location within Western Australia
- Dalgarup National Park (●)
- Type: National park
- Location: South West region
- Coordinates: 33.9846°S 115.9861°E
- Area: 2,377 ha (5,870 acres)
- Established: 2004
- Administrator: Department of Biodiversity, Conservation and Attractions

Dalgarup National Park is a national park in the South West region of Western Australia, 275 kilometres (171 mi) south of Perth. It is predominantly located in the Shire of Bridgetown–Greenbushes, except for a small part in the south-western corner of the national park, which is located in the Shire of Nannup. It is located in the Jarrah Forest and Warren bioregions.

Dalgarup National Park was created in 2004 as Class A reserve No. 47885 with a size of 2,377 hectares (5,870 acres) by an act of parliament by the Parliament of Western Australia on 8 December 2004, as one of 19 national parks declared in the state that day.
