= List of protected areas of Western Australia =

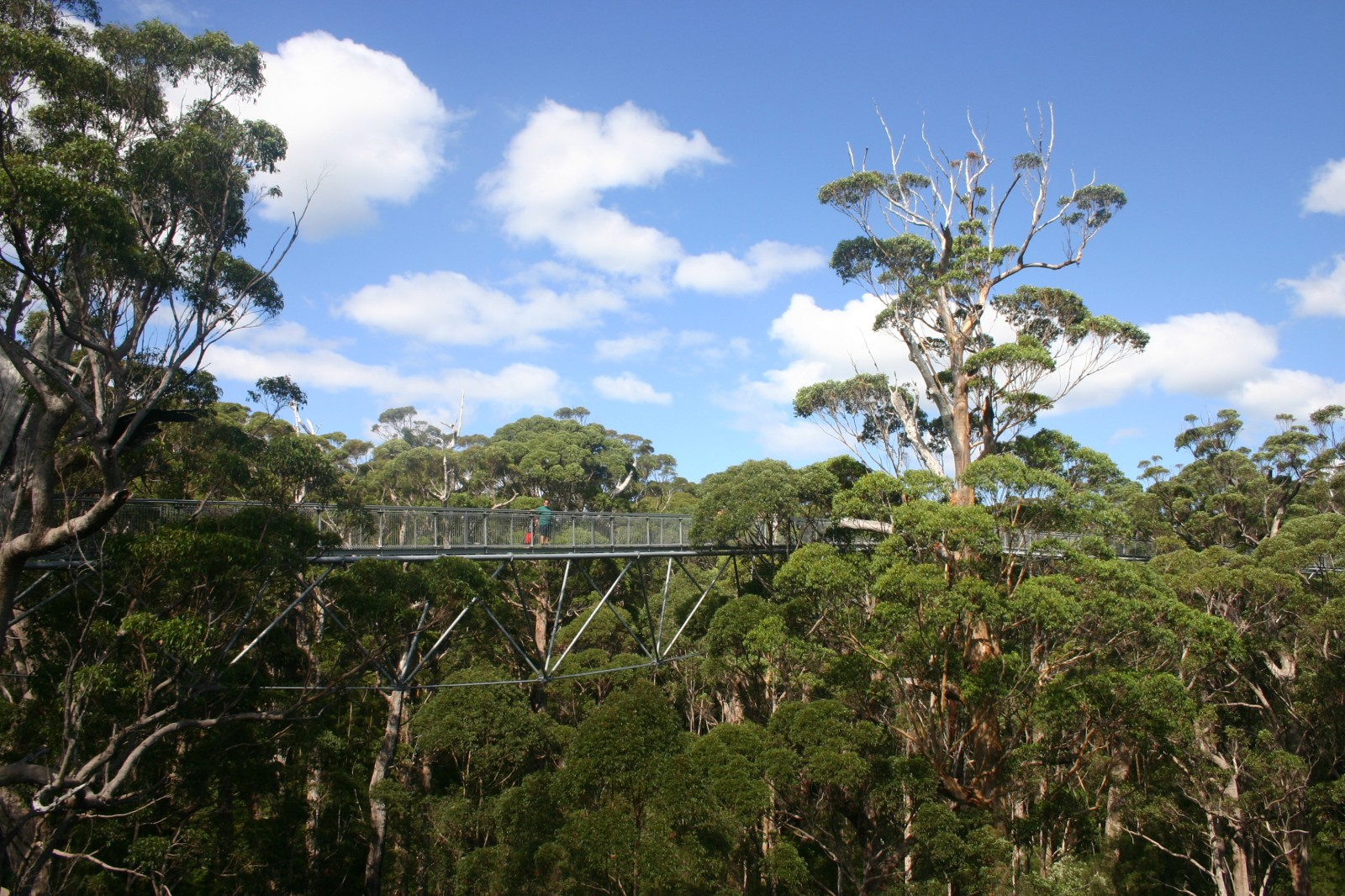
The Valley of the Giants skywalk at Walpole-Nornalup National Park

Western Australia is the second largest country subdivision in the world.

As of 2022, based on the latest Collaborative Australian Protected Areas Database report, it contains 1857 separate land-based protected areas with a total area of 76,142,710 hectares (188,152,700 acres), accounting for just over 30 percent of the state's land mass. By area, Indigenous Protected Areas account for the largest part of this, almost 67 percent while, by number, nature reserves hold the majority with two-third of all land-based protected areas being nature reserves.

Marine-based protected areas in Western Australia, as of 2022, covered 4,751,462 hectares (11,741,120 acres) or 41.05 percent of the state's waters. 41 individual Marine Protected Areas existed in the state of which the largest amount, 20, were Marine Parks, followed by Marine Reserves with 15. Marine Parks accounted for 92.25 percent of all Marine Protected Areas in the state.

== Protected areas of Western Australia ==
=== Conservation Parks ===
As of 2022, the following 72 conservation parks exist in Western Australia, covering 1,262,139 hectares (3,118,810 acres) or 0.5 percent of Western Australia's land mass, and accounting for 1.66 percent of all protected areas in the state.

- Barnabinmah
- Blackbutt
- Boyagarring
- Brooking Gorge
- Burra
- Camp Creek
- Cane River
- Cape Range
- Coalseam
- Dardanup
- Devonian Reef
- Geikie Gorge
- Goldfields Woodlands
- Gooralong
- Hester
- Jinmarnkur
- Kerr
- Korijekup
- Kujungurru Warrarn
- Lakeside
- Lane Poole Reserve
- Laterite
- Len Howard
- Leschenault Peninsula
- Leschenaultia
- Lupton
- Montebello Islands
- Mount Manning Range
- Muja
- Penguin Island
- R 46235
- Rapids
- Rock Gully
- Rowles Lagoon
- Shell Beach
- Totadgin
- Unnamed WA01333
- Unnamed WA17804
- Unnamed WA23088
- Unnamed WA23920
- Unnamed WA24657
- Unnamed WA29901
- Unnamed WA33448
- Unnamed WA34213
- Unnamed WA38749
- Unnamed WA39584
- Unnamed WA39752
- Unnamed WA41986
- Unnamed WA43290
- Unnamed WA46756
- Unnamed WA47100
- Unnamed WA48291
- Unnamed WA48436
- Unnamed WA48717
- Unnamed WA49144
- Unnamed WA49220
- Unnamed WA49363
- Unnamed WA49561
- Unnamed WA49742
- Unnamed WA49994
- Unnamed WA51272
- Unnamed WA51376
- Unnamed WA51963
- Unnamed WA52103
- Unnamed WA53269
- Unnamed WA53313
- Unnamed WA53632
- Unnamed WA53971
- Wallaroo Rock
- Walyarta
- Westralia

=== Marine Nature Reserves ===
As of 2022, 15 Marine Nature Reserves exist in Western Australia.

- Hamelin Pool

=== Marine Parks ===
As of 2022, 20 Marine parks exist in Western Australia, covering 4,385,783 hectares (10,837,510 acres) or 37.88 percent of Western Australia's waters, and accounting for 92.25 percent of all marine protected areas in the state.

- Barrow Island
- Eighty Mile Beach
- Jurien Bay
- Lalang-garram / Camden Sound
- Lalang-garram / Horizontal Falls
- Marmion
- Montebello Islands
- Ngari Capes
- Ningaloo
- North Kimberley
- North Lalang-garram
- Rowley Shoals
- Shark Bay
- Shoalwater Islands
- Swan Estuary
- Swan Estuary - Alfred Cove
- Swan Estuary - Milyu
- Swan Estuary - Pelican Point
- Walpole And Nornalup Inlets
- Yawuru Nagulagun / Roebuck Bay

=== National Parks ===
==== Overview ====
Western Australia has had national parks or protected areas under legislation since the early 20th century. National Parks (and the earlier forms of reserve) in Western Australia came under a range of agencies:

- Department of Lands and Surveys: 1 January 1890 - (partly split) 31 December 1895
- Wood and Forests Department: 1 January 1896 – 31 December 1918
- Forests Department: 1 January 1919 – 21 March 1985
- State Gardens Board: 15 December 1920 – 30 April 1957 (Parks and Reserves Act 1895)
- National Parks Board: 1 May 1957 – 30 July 1977
- Department of Fisheries and Fauna: 1 October 1964 – 31 December 1973
- National Parks Authority: 1 August 1977 – 15 April 1985
  - The National Parks and Nature Conservation Authority replaced the National Parks Authority on 16 April 1985 ceased 30 October 2000. Then to the Conservation Commission.
- Wildlife section of the Department of Fisheries and Wildlife: 1 January 1974 – 21 March 1985
- Department of Environment: 1 July 2004 – 30 June 2006
- Department of Conservation and Land Management (CALM): 22 March 1985 – 30 June 2006 (Conservation and Land Management Act 1984)
- Department of Parks and Wildlife (2006 to 2017 ?)
- The Department of Biodiversity, Conservation and Attractions was created on 1 July 2017

==== List ====
As of 2023, Western Australia has 112 national parks. At the time of the 2022 Collaborative Australian Protected Areas Database report, the 110 then-registered national parks covered 6,511,458 hectares (16,090,160 acres) or 2.58 percent of Western Australia's land mass, and accounting for 8.55 percent of all protected areas in the state.

- Alexander Morrison
- Avon Valley
- Badgingarra
- Beelu
- Blackwood River
- Boorabbin
- Boorara-Gardner
- Boyndaminup
- Brockman
- Bunuba
- Cape Arid
- Cape Le Grand
- Cape Range
- Cape Range (South)
- Collier Range
- Dalgarup
- Danggu Gorge (formerly Geikie Gorge)
- D’Entrecasteaux
- Dirk Hartog Island
- Drovers Cave
- Dryandra Woodland
- Drysdale River
- Easter
- Eucla
- Fitzgerald River
- Forest Grove
- Francois Peron
- Frank Hann
- Gloucester
- Goldfields Woodlands
- Goongarrie
- Gooseberry Hill
- Greater Beedelup (formerly Beedelup)
- Greater Dordagup
- Greater Hawke
- Greater Kingston
- Greater Preston
- Greenmount
- Gull Rock
- Hassell
- Helena
- Hilliger
- Houtman Abrolhos Islands
- Jane
- John Forrest
- Kalamunda
- Kalbarri
- Karijini
- Karlamilyi (formerly Rudall River)
- Kennedy Range
- Korung (formerly Pickering Brook)
- Lake Muir
- Lakeside
- Lawley River
- Leeuwin-Naturaliste
- Lesmurdie Falls
- Lesueur
- Matuwa Kurrara Kurrara
- Midgegooroo (formerly Canning)
- Millstream Chichester
- Milyeannup
- Mirima (formerly Hidden Valley)
- Mitchell River
- Moore River
- Mount Augustus
- Mount Frankland
- Mount Frankland North
- Mount Frankland South
- Mount Lindesay
- Mount Roe
- Mungada Ridge
- Murujuga
- Nambung
- Neerabup
- Niiwalarra Islands
- Peak Charles
- Pimbee
- Porongurup
- Prince Regent
- Purnululu
- Scott
- Serpentine
- Shannon
- Sir James Mitchell
- Stirling Range
- Stokes
- Tathra
- Torndirrup
- Tuart Forest
- Tunnel Creek
- Warlibirri
- Walpole-Nornalup
- Walyunga
- Wandoo
- Warren
- Watheroo
- Waychinicup
- Wellington
- West Cape Howe
- Whicher
- William Bay
- Wiltshire-Butler
- Windjana Gorge
- Wolfe Creek Meteorite Crater
- Wooditjup
- Yalgorup
- Yanchep
- Yelverton

=== Nature Reserves ===
As of 2022, the following 1,233 nature reserves exist in Western Australia, covering 10,074,297 hectares (24,894,130 acres) or 3.99 percent of Western Australia's land mass, and accounting for 13.23 percent of all protected areas in the state.

==== Named ====
As of 2022, 826 named nature reserves exist in Western Australia.

- Adele Island
- Airlie Island
- Alco
- Alexander
- Alfred Cove
- Amery
- Anderson Lake
- Arpenteur
- Arthur River
- Austin Bay
- Badjaling
- Badjaling North
- Badjaling West
- Bakers Junction
- Baladjie Lake
- Balannup Lake
- Bald Island
- Balicup Lake
- Balkuling
- Ballast Pit
- Bambanup
- Banksia
- Barbalin
- Barlee Range
- Barrabarra
- Barracca
- Barrow Island
- Bartletts Well
- Bartram
- Bashford
- Basil Road
- Beaufort Bridge
- Beaumont
- Bebenorin
- Bedout Island
- Beebeegnying
- Beechina
- Beechina North
- Beejenup
- Beekeepers
- Beetalyinna
- Bella Vista
- Bendering
- Benger Swamp
- Bernier and Dorre Islands
- Bessieres Island
- Betts
- Bewmalling
- Biglin
- Biljahnie Rock
- Billericay
- Billyacatting Hill
- Biluny Wells
- Binaronca
- Bindoo Hill
- Bindoon Spring
- Birdwhistle
- Birdwood
- Bishops
- Blue Gum Creek
- Blue Well
- Bobakine
- Bockaring
- Bokan
- Bokarup
- Bon Accord Road
- Boodadong
- Boodie, Double Middle Islands
- Boolading
- Boolanelling
- Boonadgin
- Boonanarring
- Booraan
- Boothendarra
- Bootine
- Boullanger, Whitlock, Favourite, Tern and Osprey Islands
- Boundain
- Bowgada
- Bowgarder
- Boyagin
- Boyermucking
- Bradford
- Breakaway Ridge
- Breaksea Island
- Breera Road
- Broadwater
- Brooks
- Brookton Highway
- Broomehill
- Browse Island
- Bruce Rock
- Buchanan
- Bugin
- Bulgin
- Buller
- Bullsbrook
- Bundarra
- Bungulla
- Buntine
- Burdett
- Burdett North
- Burdett South
- Burges Spring
- Burgess Well
- Burma Road
- Burnside and Simpson Island
- Burracoppin
- Burroloo Well
- Bushfire Rock
- Byrd Swamp
- Cairlocup
- Cairn
- Calcaling
- Camel Lake
- Camerer
- Canna
- Capamauro
- Capel
- Capercup Road North
- Cardunia Rocks
- Cardup
- Carlyarn
- Carmody
- Carnac Island
- Caron
- Carrabin
- Carribin Rock
- Carrolup
- Cartamulligan Well
- Cascade
- Casuarina
- Chandala
- Charles Gardner Reserve
- Chatham Island
- Cheadanup
- Cherry Tree Pool
- Chester
- Cheyne Island
- Cheyne Road
- Chiddarcooping
- Chilimony
- Chillinup
- Chinamans Pool
- Chinocup
- Chinocup Dam
- Chirelillup
- Chittering Lakes
- Chorkerup
- Clackline
- Claypit
- Clear and Muddy Lakes
- Clyde Hill
- Cobertup
- Coblinine
- Commodine
- Concaring
- Condarnin Rock
- Cookinbin
- Coolinup
- Coomallo
- Coomelberrup
- Cootayerup
- Copley Dale
- Corackerup
- Corneecup
- Coulomb Point
- Cowerup
- Coyrecup
- Craig
- Crampton
- Creery Island
- Cronin
- Crooks
- Culbin
- Cullen
- Cutubury
- Dalyup
- Damboring
- Damnosa
- Dangin
- Danjinning
- Dattening
- De La Poer Range
- Dead Mans Swamp
- Depot Hill
- Derdibin Rock
- Dingerlin
- Dingo Rock
- Dingo Well
- Dongara
- Dongolocking
- Donnelly River
- Donnybrook Boyup Brook Road
- Dookanooka
- Dordie Rocks
- Doubtful Islands
- Doutha Soak
- Dowak
- Down Road
- Dragon Rocks
- Dragon Tree Soak
- Drummond
- Dukin
- Duladgin
- Dulbelling
- Dulbining
- Dumbleyung Lake
- Dundas
- Dundas Road
- Dunn Rock
- Durokoppin
- East Collanilling
- East Latham
- East Naernup
- East Nugadong
- East Wallambin
- East Yorkrakine
- East Yornaning
- East Yuna
- Eastbrook
- Eaton
- Eclipse Island
- Elashgin
- Ellen Brook
- Elliot
- Elphin
- Emu Hill
- Eneminga
- Eradu
- Erangy Spring
- Errina Road
- Escape Island
- Falls Brook
- Faunadale
- Fields
- Fish Road
- Flagstaff
- Flat Rock
- Flat Rock Gully
- Flinders Bay
- Flowery Patch
- Folly
- Formby
- Forrestdale Lake
- Fourteen Mile Brook
- Fowler Gully
- Freycinet, Double Islands etc
- Frog Rock
- Gabbin
- Gabwotting
- Gagarlagu
- Galamup
- Galena
- Gathercole
- Geekabee Hill
- Geeraning
- Gibbs Road
- Gibson Desert
- Gill
- Gillingarra
- Gingilup Swamps
- Gingin Stock Route
- Glasse Island
- Gledhow
- Glenluce
- Gnandaroo Island
- Gnarkaryelling
- Goegrup Lake
- Goodenough
- Goodlands
- Gorge Rock
- Granite Hill
- Great Victoria Desert
- Greaves Road
- Green Island
- Greenbushes
- Griffiths
- Gundaring
- Gundaring Lake
- Gunyidi
- Gwalia
- Haag
- Haddleton
- Haddleton Springs
- Hamelin Island
- Harris
- Harrismith
- Harry Waring Marsupial Reserve
- Harvey Flats
- Hayes
- Heathland
- Herndermuning
- Highbury
- Hill River
- Hillman
- Hindmarsh
- Hines Hill
- Hobart Road
- Holland Rocks
- Hopkins
- Horne
- Hotham River
- Howatharra
- Hurdle Creek
- Ibis Lake
- Indarra Spring
- Inkpen Road
- Investigator Island
- Jackson
- Jaloran
- Jam Hill
- Jandabup
- Jarrkunpungu
- Jebarjup
- Jeffrey Lagoon
- Jerdacuttup Lakes
- Jibberding
- Jilbadji
- Jingalup
- Jingaring
- Jinmarnkur Kulja
- Jitarning
- Jocks Well
- Johns Well
- Jouerdine
- Jura
- Kadathinni
- Kalgan Plains
- Kambalda
- Karamarra
- Karlgarin
- Karloning
- Karnet
- Karroun Hill
- Kathleen
- Kau Rock
- Keaginine
- Kendall Road
- Kenwick Wetlands
- King Rock
- Kirwan
- Kockatea
- Kodj Kodjin
- Kodjinup
- Kokerbin
- Koks Island
- Kondinin Lake
- Kondinin Salt Marsh
- Koodjee
- Koolanooka
- Koolanooka Dam
- Koolberin
- Kooljerrenup
- Koornong
- Korbel
- Kordabup
- Korrelocking
- Kuender
- Kujungurru Warrarn
- Kulikup
- Kulin Road
- Kulunilup
- Kulyaling
- Kundip
- Kurrawang
- Kwolyin
- Kwolyinine
- Kwornicup Lake
- Lacepede Islands
- Lake Ace
- Lake Barnes Road
- Lake Biddy
- Lake Bryde
- Lake Campion
- Lake Cronin
- Lake Eyrie
- Lake Gounter
- Lake Hinds
- Lake Hurlstone
- Lake Janet
- Lake Joondalup
- Lake King
- Lake Liddelow
- Lake Logue
- Lake Magenta
- Lake McLarty
- Lake Mealup
- Lake Mears
- Lake Mortijinup
- Lake Muir
- Lake Ninan
- Lake Pleasant View
- Lake Powell
- Lake Shaster
- Lake Varley
- Lake Wannamal
- Lake Warden
- Lakeland
- Lambkin
- Lancelin and Edwards Islands
- Landscape Hill
- Latham
- Lavender
- Leda
- Lesueur Island
- Little Rocky Island
- Locke
- Locker Island
- Lockhart
- Long Creek
- Long Pool
- Low Rocks
- Lowendal Islands
- Mailalup
- Mallee
- Mallee Plain
- Malyalling
- Manaling
- Mangkili Claypan
- Manmanning
- Manmanning Dam
- Manning Road
- Maragoonda
- Marbelup
- Marble Rocks
- Marchagee
- Marindo
- Marrarup
- Martinjinni
- Martinup
- Maublarling
- Maughan
- Mavis Jefferys
- Maya
- McDougall
- McGauran
- McGlinn
- McIntosh Road
- McLarty
- McLean Road
- Mealup Point
- Meelon
- Meenaar
- Mehniup
- Merewana
- Merilup
- Merredin
- Mettabinup
- Mettler Lake
- Michaelmas Island
- Mill Brook
- Milyu
- Mingenew
- Mininup
- Minniging
- Minnivale
- Minyulo
- Miripin
- Mistaken Island
- Mockerdungulling
- Modong
- Moganmoganing
- Mogumber
- Mogumber West
- Mokamie
- Mokine
- Mollerin
- Mongelup
- Moochamulla
- Moojebing
- Moomagul
- Moondyne
- Moonijin
- Mooradung
- Mooraning
- Moore River
- Moornaming
- Moorumbine
- Morangarel
- Morangup
- Mordetta
- Mortlock
- Morton
- Moulien
- Mount Burdett
- Mount Byroomanning
- Mount Caroline
- Mount Hampton
- Mount Manning Range
- Mount Manypeaks
- Mount Mason
- Mount Ney
- Mount Nunn
- Mount Pleasant
- Mount Ridley
- Mount Shadforth
- Mount Stirling
- Mournucking
- Muiron Islands
- Mullet Lake
- Mungaroona Range
- Mungarri
- Mungerungcutting
- Munglinup
- Muntz
- Murapin
- Murnanying
- Nabaroo
- Nallian
- Namban
- Namelcatchem
- Namming
- Nanamoolan
- Nangeen Hill
- Nangeenan
- Napier
- Napping
- Narlingup
- Neale Junction
- Neaves Road
- Needham
- Needilup
- Neendojer Rock
- Neerabup
- Nembudding
- Nembudding South
- Neredup
- Ngopitchup
- Niblick
- Nilgen
- Nilligarri
- Nine Mile Lake
- Nollajup
- Nonalling
- Noobijup
- Noombling
- Noonebin
- Noonying
- Noorajin Soak
- Norpa
- North Baandee
- North Beacon
- North Bonnie Rock
- North Bungulla
- North Dandalup
- North Jitarning
- North Karlgarin
- North Sandy Island
- North Sister
- North Tammin
- North Tarin Rock
- North Turtle Island
- North Wagin
- North Wallambin
- North Woyerling
- North Yilliminning
- Nugadong
- Nukarni
- Nullilla
- Nuytsland
- Oakabella
- Oakajee
- Ockley
- Ogilvie
- Old Store
- One Mile Rocks
- One Tree Point
- Ongerup Lagoon
- Orchid
- Ord River
- Overheu
- Overshot Hill
- Owingup
- Pagett
- Pallarup
- Pallinup
- Pantapin
- Paperbark
- Pardelup
- Pardelup Road
- Parkerville
- Parkeyerring
- Parry Lagoons
- Pederah
- Pelican Island
- Peringillup
- Petercarring
- Phillips Brook
- Piara
- Pikaring
- Pikaring West
- Pindicup
- Pingaring
- Pingeculling
- Pingelly
- Pinjarrega
- Pintharuka
- Pintharuka Well
- Pinticup
- Plain Hills
- Plumridge Lakes
- Point Spring
- Poison Gully
- Pootenup
- Port Kennedy Scientific Park
- Powlalup
- Protheroe
- Quagering
- Quairading Spring
- Quarram
- Queen Victoria Spring
- Quindinup
- Quins Hill
- Quongunnerunding
- Randell Road
- Recherche Archipelago
- Red Hill
- Red Lake
- Red Lake Townsite
- Redmond Road
- Reen Road
- Rica Erickson
- Ridley North
- Ridley South
- Riverdale
- Roach
- Rock Hole Dam
- Rock View
- Roe
- Rogers
- Rose Road
- Rosedale
- Round Island
- Ruabon Townsite
- Rudyard Beach
- Rugged Hills
- Sabina
- Salt Lake
- Sand Spring Well
- Sandford Rocks
- Sawyers
- Scotsdale Road
- Scriveners
- Seagroatt
- Seal Island (WA25645)
- Seal Island (WA32199)
- Serrurier Island
- Sevenmile Well
- Sewell
- Shackleton
- Shark Lake
- Shelter Island
- Silver Wattle Hill
- Six Mile Road
- Ski Lake
- Sleeman Creek
- Sloss
- Smith Brook
- Snake Gully
- Sorensens
- South Buniche
- South Eneabba
- South Jingalup
- South Kuender
- South Kulin
- South Kumminin
- South Mimegarra
- South Sister
- South Stirling
- South Wilgoyne
- Southern Beekeepers
- Sparks Road
- Speddingup East
- Springdale
- St Alouarn Island
- St. Ronans
- Stinton Cascades
- Stockdill Road
- Strange Road
- Strathmore Hill
- Stretton Road
- Sugar Loaf Rock
- Swan Island
- Swan Lagoon
- Sweetman
- Taarblin Lake
- Takenup Road
- Talbot Road
- Tammin Railway Dam
- Tank Hill
- Tanner Island
- Tapper Road
- Tarin Rock
- Tennessee North
- Tent Island
- Tenterden
- The Forty Four Mile
- The Tubbs
- Thomsons Lake
- Three Swamps
- Throssell
- Timaru
- Tinkelelup
- Tone-Perup
- Toolibin
- Toolonga
- Toompup
- Tootanellup
- Towerrining
- Trigwell
- Truslove North
- Truslove Townsite
- Tutanning
- Twin Swamps
- Two Peoples Bay
- Twongkup
- Twyata
- Udumung
- Ulva
- Unicup
- Urawa
- Utcha Well
- Vagg
- Victor Island
- Victoria Rock
- Wagin Lake
- Wahkinup
- Walburra
- Walbyring
- Walcancobbing
- Walk Walkin
- Wallaby Hills
- Wallambin
- Walyahmoning
- Walyormouring
- Wamballup
- Wambyn
- Wamenusking
- Wanagarren
- Wandana
- Wandi
- Wandjagill
- Wandoora
- Wangeling Gully
- Wanjarri
- Wansbrough
- Wardering Lake
- Warramuggan
- Warranine
- Warrawah
- Warrenup
- Watkins Road
- Wattening
- Weam
- Wedge Island
- Wedgengully
- Weelhamby Lake
- Weira
- Weirmonger
- Weld Island
- Wellard
- Welsh
- West Mount Mason
- West Perenjori
- Westmere
- Whalebone Island
- Whin Bin Rock
- Whistler
- White Gums
- White Lake
- Whitmore, Roberts, Doole Islands and Sandalwood Landing
- Wialkutting
- Wild Horse Swamp
- Wilga
- Wilgarrup
- Williams
- Willoughby
- Wills
- Wilroy
- Wilson
- Wingedine
- Wockallarry
- Wogerlin
- Wokatherra
- Wongamine
- Wongan Hills
- Wongonderrah
- Wongoondy
- Woodanilling
- Woody Island
- Woody Lake
- Woondowing
- Woorgabup
- Woottating
- Wotto
- Woyerling
- Wulyaling
- Wundowlin
- Wyalkatchem
- Wyening
- Wyola
- Wyvern Road
- Xantippe
- Y Island
- Yackrikine
- Yallatup
- Yandinilling
- Yanneymooning
- Yardanogo
- Yarding
- Yarling
- Yarloop
- Yarnup
- Yarra Yarra Lakes
- Yeal
- Yelbeni
- Yellowdine
- Yenyening Lakes
- Yeo Lake
- Yetterup
- Yilgerin
- Yilliminning
- Yorkrakine Rock
- Yornaning
- Yurine Swamp
- Zuytdorp

==== Unnamed ====
As of 2022, 407 unnamed nature reserves exist in Western Australia.

==== Marine ====
As of 2022, an additional 15 nature reserves exist in Western Australia which are listed on the marine register, consisting exclusively of offshore islands, covering 9,912 hectares (24,490 acres) or 0.09 percent of Western Australia's waters, and accounting for 0.21 percent of all marine protected areas in the state.

- Beagle Islands
- Boodalan
- Buller, Whittell and Green Islands
- Cervantes Islands
- Essex Rocks
- Fisherman Islands
- Great Sandy Island
- Lipfert, Milligan, Et cetera Islands
- Outer Rocks
- Rocky Island
- Ronsard Rocks
- Sandland Island
- Scott Reef
- Shoalwater Bay Islands
- Thevenard Island

=== Regional parks ===
- Banyowla
- Beeliar
- Canning River
- Chapman River
- Herdsman Lake
- Jandakot
- Meelup
- Mundy
- Rockingham Lakes
- Usher-Dalyellup
- Woodman Point
- Wooroloo
- Wungong
- Yellagonga

=== Section 5(1)(g) and (h) Reserves ===
Under the CALM Act, land designated as 5(1)(g) Reserve and 5(1)(h) Reserve is land vested in the Conservation and Parks Commission of Western Australia that is not a National Park, Conservation Park, Nature Reserve, Marine Park or Marine Nature Reserve. Such land may have a wide variety of purposes, but are normally related to recreation, wildlife conservation, infrastructure and historical features.

As of 2022, 44 5(1)(g) Reserves exist in Western Australia, covering 220,824 hectares (545,670 acres) or 0.09 percent of Western Australia's land mass, and accounting for 0.29 percent of all protected areas in the state.

- Bullock Holes Timber Reserve
- Coonana Timber Reserve
- Emu Rocks Timber Reserve
- Kangaroo Hills Timber Reserve
- Keanes Point Reserve
- Lakeside Timber Reserve
- Lane Poole Reserve
- Matilda Bay Reserve
- Monadnocks Section 5(1)(g) Reserve
- Purnululu Conservation Reserve
- Sandalwood Block Timber Reserve
- Scahill Timber Reserve
- Sedimentary Deposits Reserve
- Stockyard Gully Reserve
- Wallaby Rocks Timber Reserve
- Unnamed Section 5(1)(g) Reserves (30 different areas)

As of 2022, 129 5(1)(h) Reserves exist in Western Australia, covering 786,924 hectares (1,944,530 acres) or 0.31 percent of Western Australia's land mass, and accounting for 1.03 percent of all protected areas in the state.

- Barrbem
- Broome Bird Observatory
- Broome Wildlife Centre
- Bundegi Coastal Park
- Buntine
- Darram
- Darrmalanka
- Gooming
- Helms Arboretum
- Jemarnde-wooningim
- Jurabi Coastal Park
- Kalgoorlie Arboretum
- Kununurra Arboretum
- Mandoon Farm
- Mijing
- Monkey Mia
- Moondyne Convention Centre
- Moondyne Stronghills
- Murujuga
- Ngamoowalem
- Nyingguulu (Ningaloo) Coastal
- Ord River Regeneration
- Voyagers Park
- Wellington Discovery Forest
- Woodvale
- Yallari Timber
- Unnamed Section 5(1)(h) Reserves (103 different areas)

=== Indigenous Protected Areas ===
As of 2022, the following 18 Indigenous Protected Areas exist in Western Australia, covering 50,915,811 hectares (125,815,710 acres) or 20.15 percent of Western Australia's land mass, and accounting for 66.87 percent of all protected areas in the state.

- Anangu Tjutaku Indigenous Protected Area
- Balanggarra Indigenous Protected Area
- Bardi Jawi Indigenous Protected Area
- Birriliburu Indigenous Protected Area
- Dambimangari Indigenous Protected Area
- Karajarri Indigenous Protected Area
- Kiwirrkurra Indigenous Protected Area
- Matuwa and Kurrara-Kurrara Indigenous Protected Area
- Ngaanyatjarra Indigenous Protected Area
- Ngadju Indigenous Protected Area
- Ngururrpa Indigenous Protected Area
- Ninghan Indigenous Protected Area
- Nyangumarta Warrarn Indigenous Protected Area
- Paruku Indigenous Protected Area
- Uunguu Indigenous Protected Area
- Warlu Jilajaa Jumu Indigenous Protected Area
- Wilinggin Indigenous Protected Area
- Yawuru Indigenous Protected Area

=== Others ===
Additionally to the protected areas listed above, Western Australia, as of 2022, also has two Botanic Gardens (Kings Park and Bold Park), 172 Conservation Covenants, ten Conservation Reserves, six Management Areas, eight Private Nature Reserves, one State Reserve (Rottnest Island) and two unclassified areas (one of those being Perth Zoo). Additionally, another 50 protected areas existed in 2022 which were waiting to be gazetted.

== See also ==
- Geography of Western Australia
- Protected areas of Australia
