= Bunuba National Park =

National park in Western Australia

- Location within Western Australia
- Bunuba National Park (●)
- Type: National park
- Location: Kimberley region
- Coordinates: 17.9347°S 125.8718°E
- Area: 220,000 ha (540,000 acres)
- Established: 2023
- Administrator: Department of Biodiversity, Conservation and Attractions Bunuba Dawangarri Aboriginal Corporation

Bunuba National Park is a national park in the Kimberley region of Western Australia, 80 kilometres (50 mi) north-east of Fitzroy Crossing. It was declared in August 2023, is located in the Shire of Derby-West Kimberley, and is part of the Central Kimberley and Dampierland bioregions.

The national park is located on the traditional land of the Bunuba people and is jointly managed by the Bunuba Dawangarri Aboriginal Corporation and the Department of Biodiversity, Conservation and Attractions. It stretches from the Danggu Gorge National Park, centred around Geikie Gorge, along the Fitzroy River to Dimond Gorge, covering 220,000 hectares (540,000 acres).

The creation of Bunuba National Park, alongside the Warlibirri National Park, which was created in 2022, aims to protect the Fitzroy and Margaret rivers.
