= Eucla National Park =

National park in Western Australia

- IUCN category II (national park)
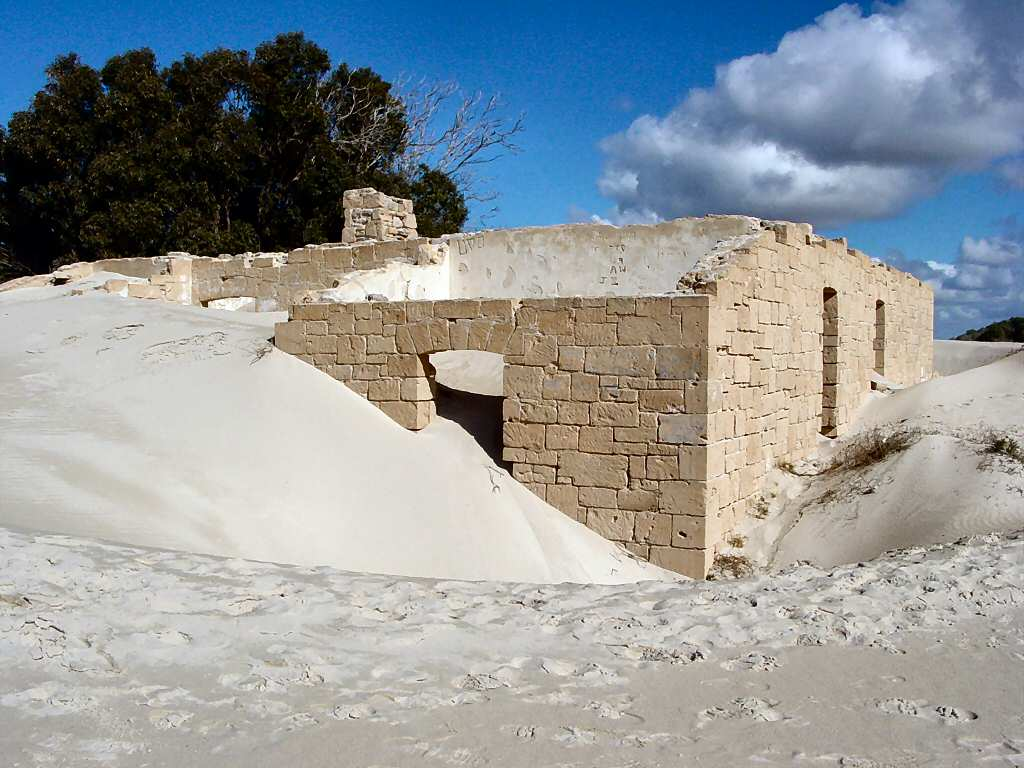
- Eucla Telegraph Station

- Location within Western Australia
- Location: Western Australia
- Coordinates: 31°40′49″S 128°56′43″E
- Area: 35.6 km^{2} (13.7 sq mi)
- Governing body: Department of Environment and Conservation
- Website: Official website

Eucla National Park is a national park in Western Australia, 1,238 kilometres (769 mi) east of Perth.

The southern edge of the park borders a section of the Great Australian Bight. Other notable features of the park include Wilson Bluff and Delisser sandhills.

The area is composed of mallee scrub and heath vegetation, typical of the southern coast. Wildflowers such as Cockie's Tongue (Templetonia retusa), with its distinctive red, pink or yellow flowers are common throughout the park. A rare plant species of senecio that is native to the limestone cliff area is known to exist in the park.

Access to the area is via the Eyre Highway found on the northern border of the park. No facilities are available for visitors in the park and no sealed roads exist within the park, only 4WD tracks.

No camping is permitted within the park; the nearest camping facilities are at Eucla and Border Village.

Historical ruins such as the Eucla Telegraph station and the original Eucla township can be found at the western end of the park. Both are partially buried by encroaching sand dunes.

== Gallery ==
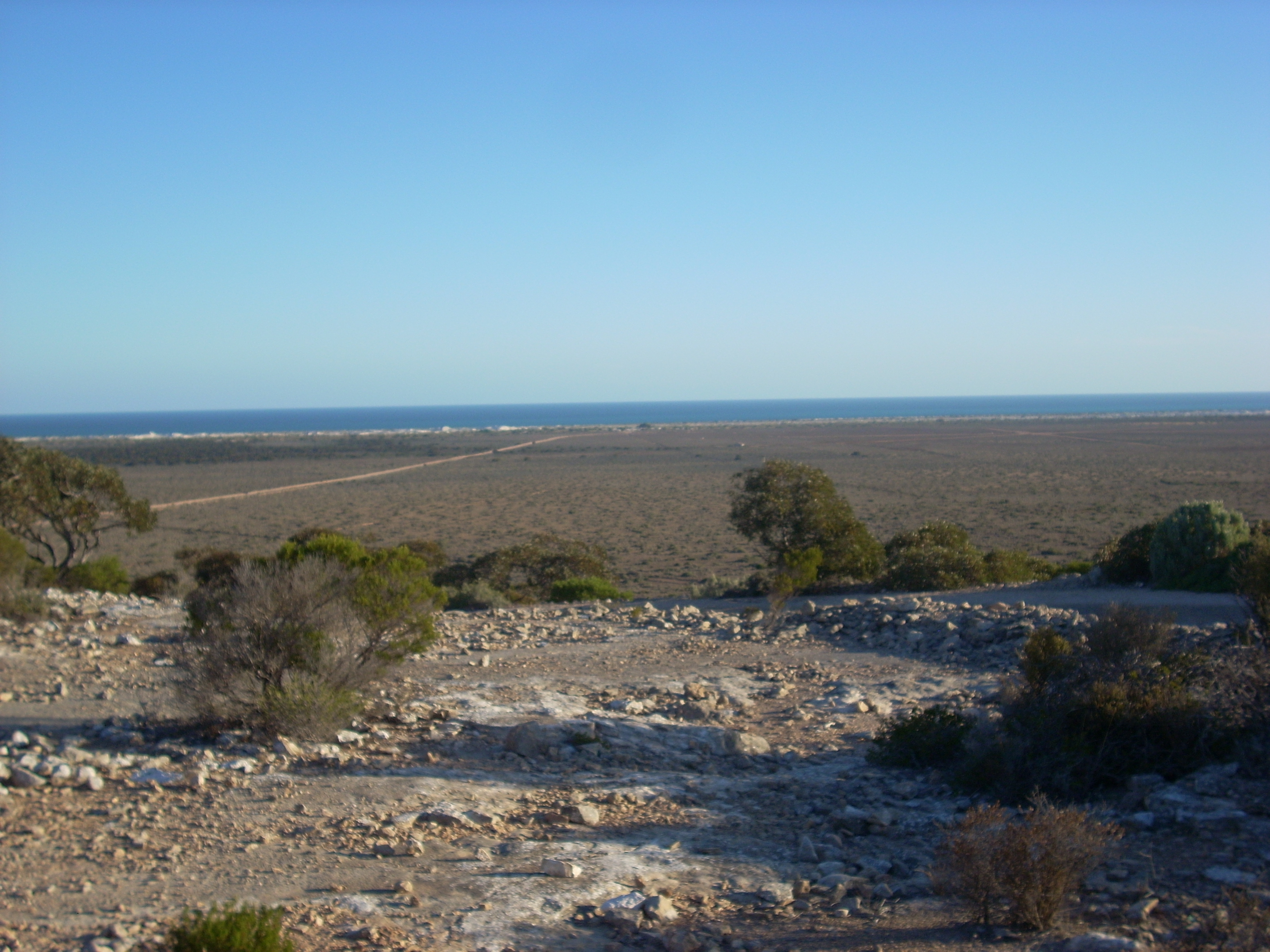
Overlooking coast near Eucla from Eucla Pass

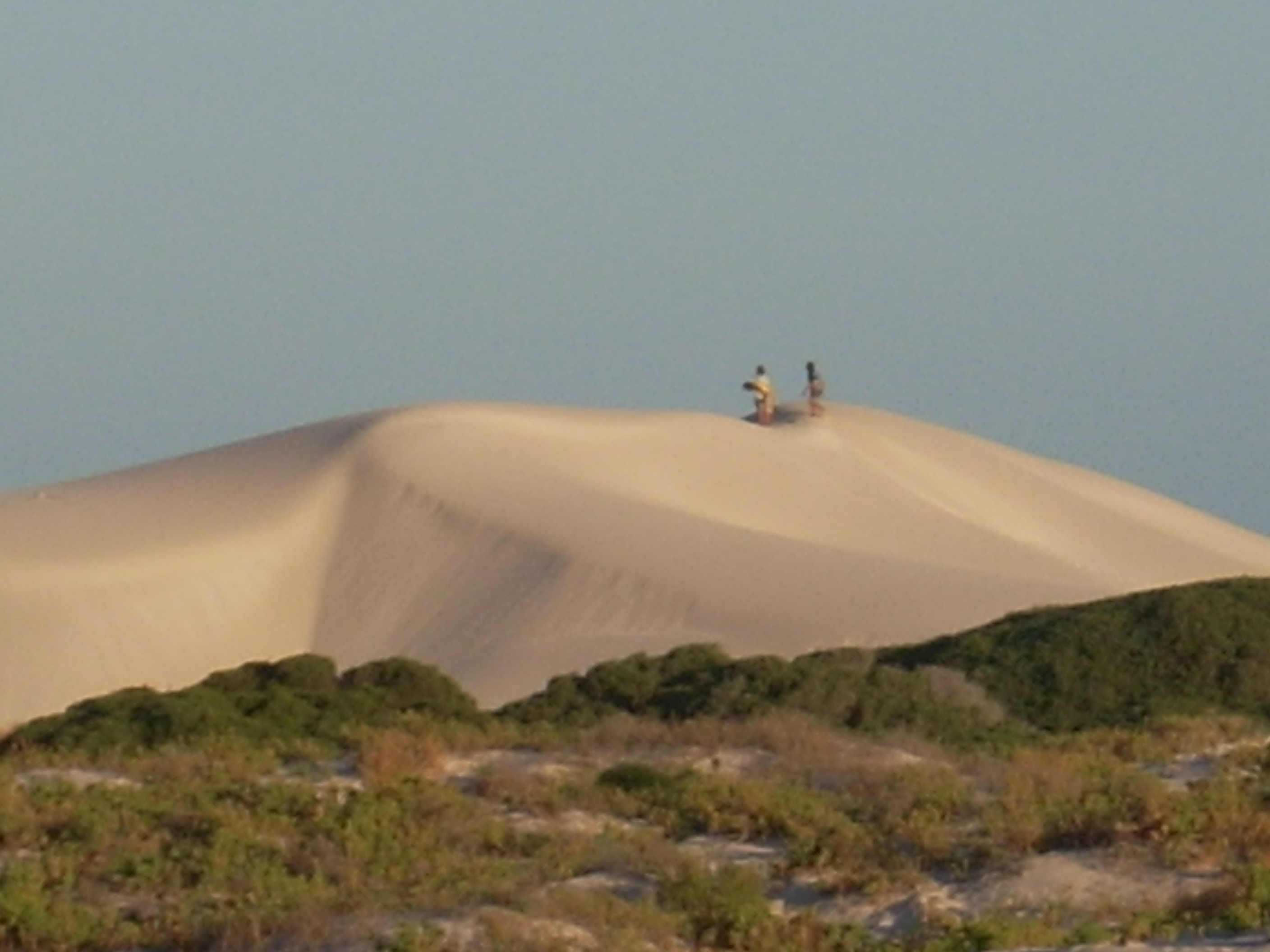
Sand dunes near Eucla

== See also ==
- Protected areas of Western Australia
