= Forest Grove National Park =

National park in Western Australia

- Location within Western Australia
- Forest Grove National Park (●) is located in the Shire of Augusta-Margaret River
- Type: National park
- Location: South West region
- Coordinates: 34.1047°S 115.1326°E
- Area: 1,379 ha (3,410 acres)
- Established: 2004
- Administrator: Department of Biodiversity, Conservation and Attractions

Forest Grove National Park is a national park in the South West region of Western Australia, 292 kilometres (181 mi) south of Perth. It is located in the Shire of Augusta-Margaret River. To the east of the national park lies an unnamed national park (WA46400), which connects Forest Grove to the Blackwood River National Park. It is located in the Jarrah Forest and Warren bioregions.

Forest Grove National Park was created in 2004 as Class A reserve No. 47673 with a size of 1,379 hectares (3,410 acres) by an act of parliament by the Parliament of Western Australia on 8 December 2004, as one of 19 national parks proclaimed in the state that day.
