= Niiwalarra Islands National Park =

National park in Western Australia

- Interactive map of Niiwalarra Islands National Park
- Type: National park
- Location: Kimberley region
- Coordinates: 13°53′24″S 126°32′46″E
- Area: 3,352 hectares (8,280 acres)
- Administrator: Department of Biodiversity, Conservation and Attractions

Niiwalarra Islands National Park is a national park in the Kimberley region of Western Australia, 250 km (160 mi) north-west of Wyndham. The national park is centered around Niiwalarra Island, formerly the Sir Graham Moore Island, but also includes some smaller near-by islands. It was declared on 4 December 2019, is located in the Shire of Wyndham-East Kimberley, and is part of the Northern Kimberley bioregion. It is the northern-most national park in Western Australia and the only one that falls into IUCN Category Ia, being classified as a strict nature reserve.

The national park is located on the traditional land of the Kwini people.

The park consists of Niiwalarra, Neawangu (formerly Scorpion Island) and Kim islands as well as the three islands of the Geranium group. The islands are located north of the Anjo peninsular, at the northern end of the Napier Broome Bay.

Remains of a recent, illegal, Indonesian fishing camp were discovered on the island in 2022, when rubbish and remnants of skinned sharks were found on the island.
