= Drovers Cave National Park =

National park in Western Australia

- IUCN category II (national park)
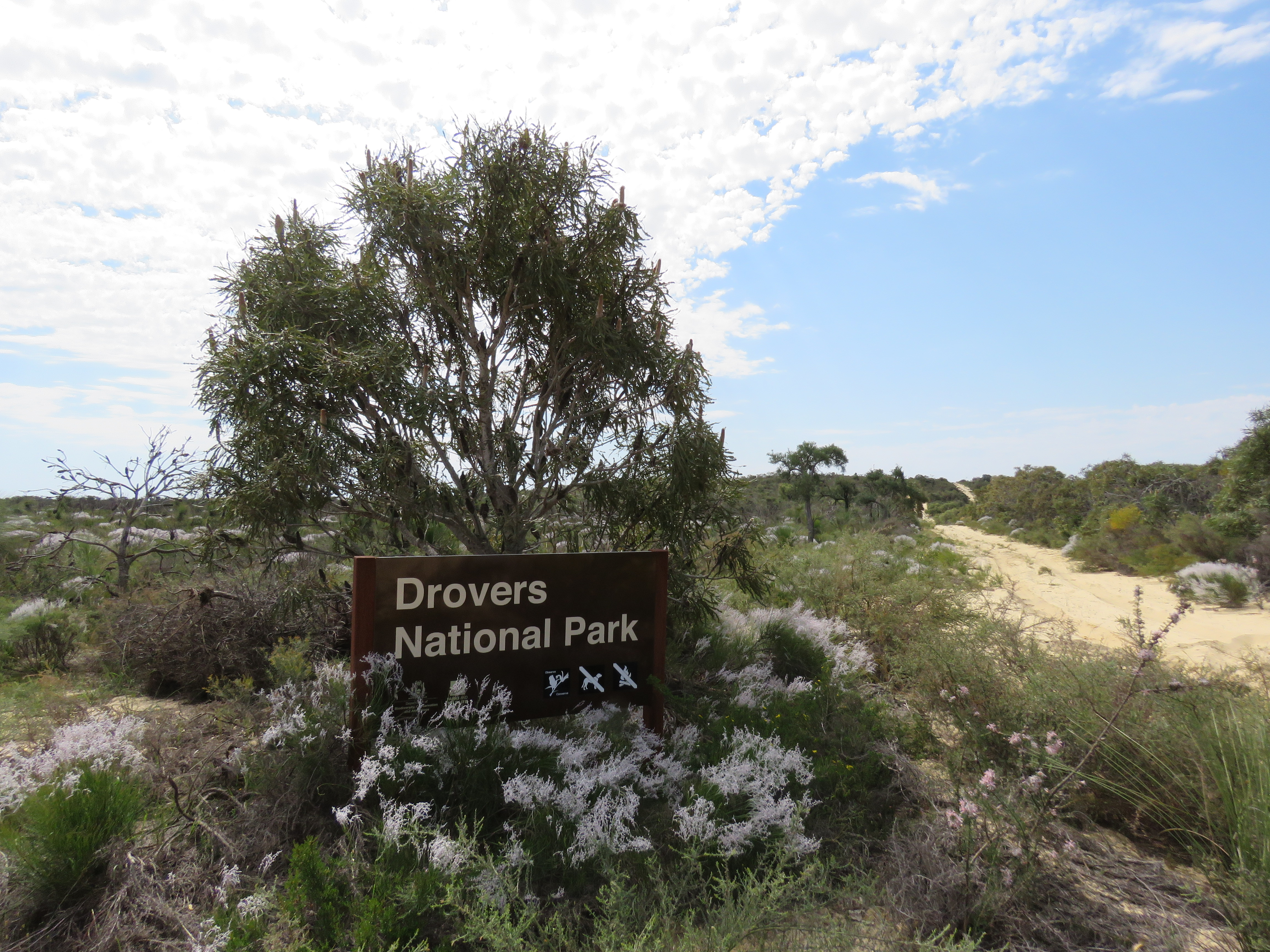
- Southern access to Drovers Cave National Park

- Location within Western Australia
- Location: Western Australia
- Nearest city: Jurien Bay
- Coordinates: 30°14′04″S 115°05′16″E
- Area: 26.81 km^{2} (10.35 sq mi)
- Established: 1972
- Governing body: Department of Environment and Conservation
- Website: Official website

Drovers Cave National Park is a national park in the Wheatbelt region of Western Australia, 201 kilometres (125 mi) northwest of Perth. The nearest town is Jurien Bay 6 kilometres (3.7 mi) to the west.

The area is composed of limestone and numerous caves are known to exist within the park boundaries. Many of the caves are locked with screens to keep visitors out in the interest of public safety and to prevent vandalism.

Some of the other caves found within the park include Hastings, Moora, Old River and Mystery Caves. Hastings cave is known to contain fossils.

Drovers Cave was well known to early explorers and stockmen; the location of the site near to the Canning Stock Route meant it was often visited by drovers, hence the name. The first known visit to the cave was a drover who signed the cave wall in 1886. Many more visits occurred between 1930 and 1940. The cave was surveyed in 1973 and gazetted as part of the National Park the same year.

Native flora within the park includes shrub banksia, one-sided bottlebrush and parrot bush. Fauna includes emus, honey possums, western pygmy possums, short-beaked echidnas, western grey kangaroos, Australian bustards and many reptiles.

== See also ==
- Protected areas of Western Australia
