= Jane National Park =

National park in Western Australia

- Location within Western Australia
- Jane National Park (●) is in the Shire of Manjimup
- Type: National park
- Location: South West region
- Coordinates: 34.605318°S 116.245408°E
- Area: 6,863 ha (16,960 acres)
- Established: 2004
- Administrator: Department of Biodiversity, Conservation and Attractions

Jane National Park is a national park in the South West region of Western Australia, 357 kilometres (222 mi) south of Perth. It is located adjacent to the west of the much larger Shannon National Park, in the Shire of Manjimup. It is located in the Warren bioregion.

Jane National Park was created in 2004 as Class A reserve No. 47666 with a size of 6,863 hectares (16,960 acres) by an act of parliament by the Parliament of Western Australia on 8 December 2004, as one of 19 national parks proclaimed in the state that day.

The national park, on land whose traditional owners are the Bibbulman people, is predominantly made up of old growth forest. It was named after his daughter Jane by Pemberton forester-in-charge John D’Espessis in 1946, originally as Jane Forrest. It has no facilities, but the Bibbulmun Track runs through the national park.
