= Mungada Ridge National Park =

National park in Western Australia

- Interactive map of Mungada Ridge National Park
- Type: National park
- Location: Mid West region
- Coordinates: 29°08′36″S 116°54′35″E
- Area: 1,031 hectares (2,550 acres)
- Established: 2022
- Administrator: Department of Biodiversity, Conservation and Attractions Conservation and Parks Commission Bundi Yamatji Aboriginal Corporation

Mungada Ridge National Park is a national park in the Mid West region of Western Australia, 90 km (56 mi) north-east of Perenjori and 200 km (120 mi) south-east of Geraldton. It was declared on 17 January 2022, is located in the Shire of Perenjori, and is part of the Yalgoo bioregion.

The national park is located on the traditional land of the Yamatji people and is jointly managed by the Bundi Yamatji Aboriginal Corporation, the Conservation and Parks Commission and the Department of Biodiversity, Conservation and Attractions.

The national park contains banded iron formations and some of the oldest rock formations in the world as well as rare plant and animal life. The area of the park lies in the Mid West iron ore mining region of Western Australia and was subject to the threat of being mined until 2014, when the Environmental Protection Authority rejected a mining proposal for Mungada Ridge. Iron ore mining outside the park's boundary continues and an application exists to extend the mining.
