= Wellington National Park =

National park in Western Australia

- IUCN category II (national park)
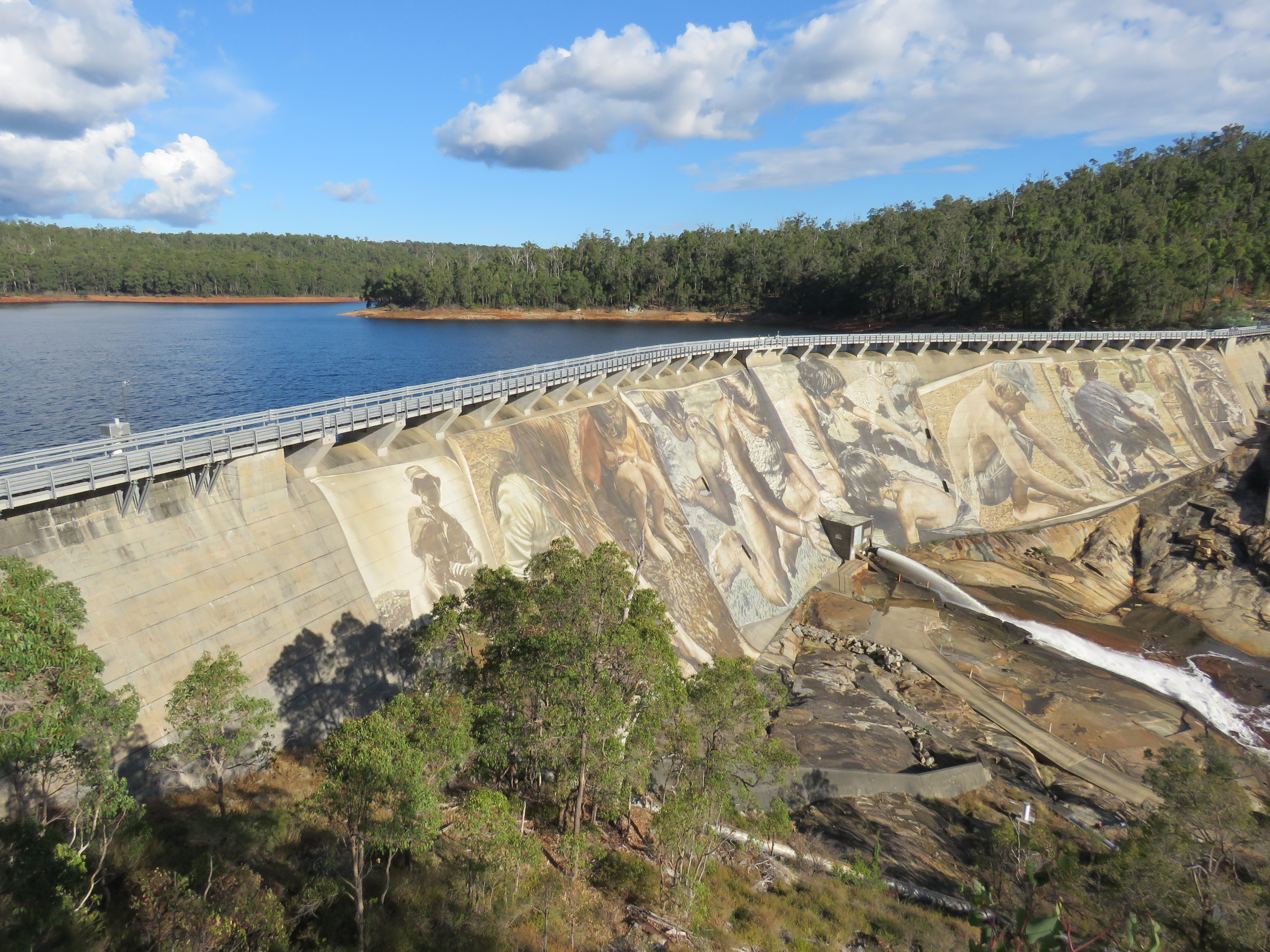
- Wellington Dam is found within the park

- Location within Western Australia
- Location: Western Australia
- Nearest city: Collie
- Coordinates: 33°19′14″S 115°58′46″E
- Area: 17,000 ha (66 sq mi)
- Established: 2000
- Visitors: 212,000 (in 2015-2016)
- Governing body: Parks and Wildlife Service

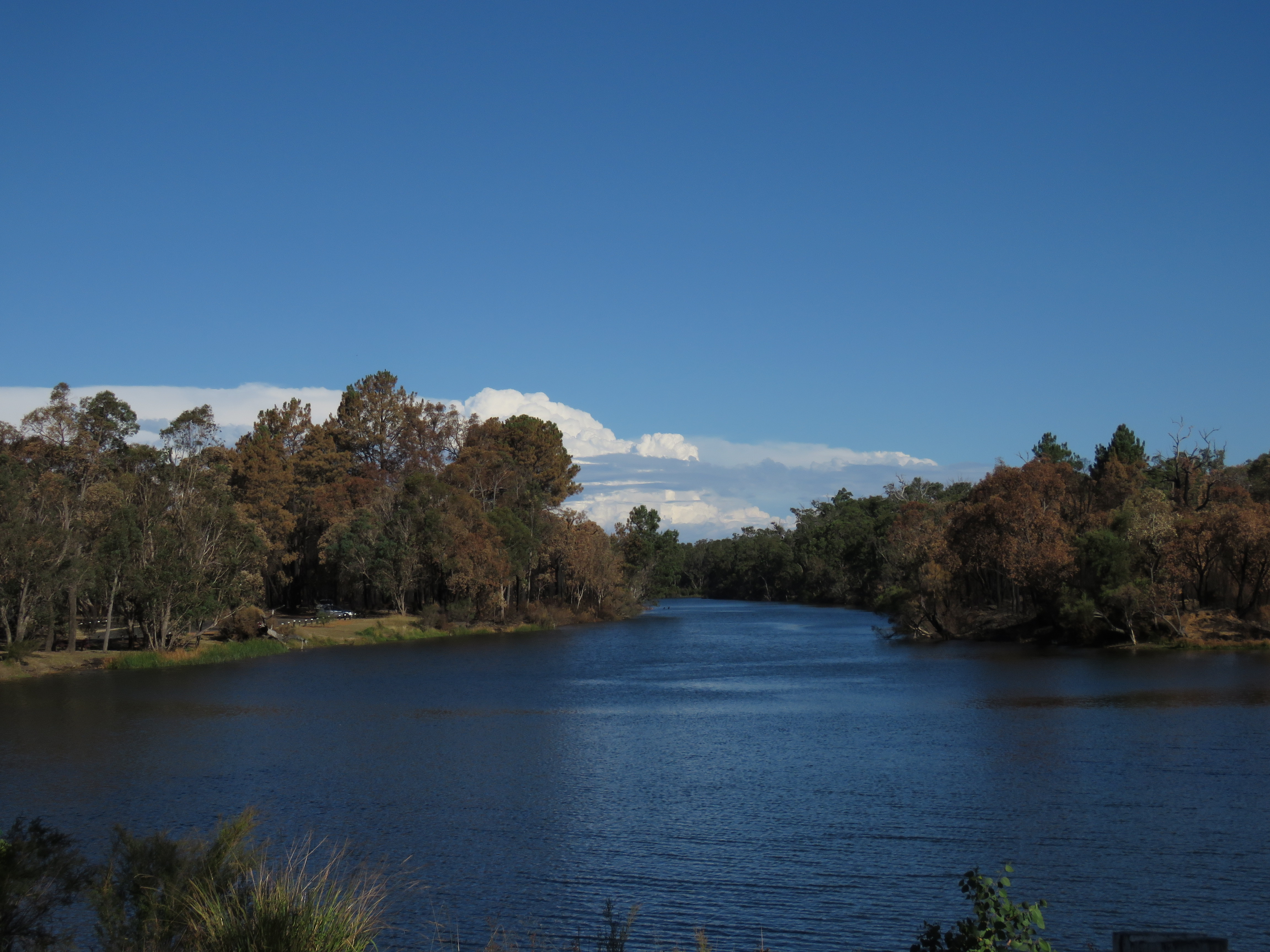
Collie River and riparian vegetation

Wellington National Park is a national park in Western Australia, located 10 kilometres (6 mi) west of Collie and approximately 215 km (134 mi) south of Perth in the Shire of Collie along the Coalfields Highway.

== Description ==
The 17,000 ha (42,000-acre) park has a hilly terrain and is intersected by streams; the Collie River valley is in the middle of the park, as is Wellington Dam. The park is within the Yilgarn craton geological province composed of belts of metamorphosed sedimentary and volcanic rocks, including large areas of granite.

== Facilities ==
Potter's Gorge has a camping area at the edge of a lake, catering for tents and caravans. There are also barbeques, picnic tables and multi-access toilets. Honeymoon Pool also has a camping area and the river is safe for swimming and canoeing. There are picnic tables, barbeques, fire pits with wood supplied and toilets. A boardwalk and platform are built on the river bank for ease of access and there are several walk trails throughout the area. The area around Wellington Dam has a kiosk and a camping area.

== History ==
The park increased in size from 4,300 ha (11,000 acres) to 17,000 ha (42,000 acres) under the Labor state government's 2001 "Protecting our old-growth forests" policy. The land now occupied by the park was formerly owned by the Worsley Timber Company. It was gazetted as a class A reserve and set aside for the purpose of "national park" in 2000. An additional 13,745 ha (33,960 acres) of State forest No. 25 was included into the Park in December 2004, increasing the total area to 16,790 ha (41,500 acres).

== Flora ==
The park is within the Jarrah Forest bioregion and is predominantly composed of unique Eucalyptus marginata (jarrah), Corymbia calophylla (marri) and Eucalyptus patens (yarri or blackbutt) forests. Species found commonly as part of the understorey include Banksia grandis (bull banksia), Allocasuarina fraseriana (sheoak), Bossiaea aquifolium (waterbush), Persoonia longifolia (snottygobble) and Xanthorrhoea preissii (grasstree).

== Fauna ==
The park provides habitat for a range of fauna; 66 species of birds are found within the park. Endangered species found in the park include the chuditch, western ringtail possum, quokka, brush-tailed phascogale, woylie, carpet python, peregrine falcon, red-tailed black cockatoo, Carnaby's black cockatoo and Baudin's cockatoo.

== See also ==
- List of protected areas of Western Australia
