= Helena National Park =

National park in Western Australia

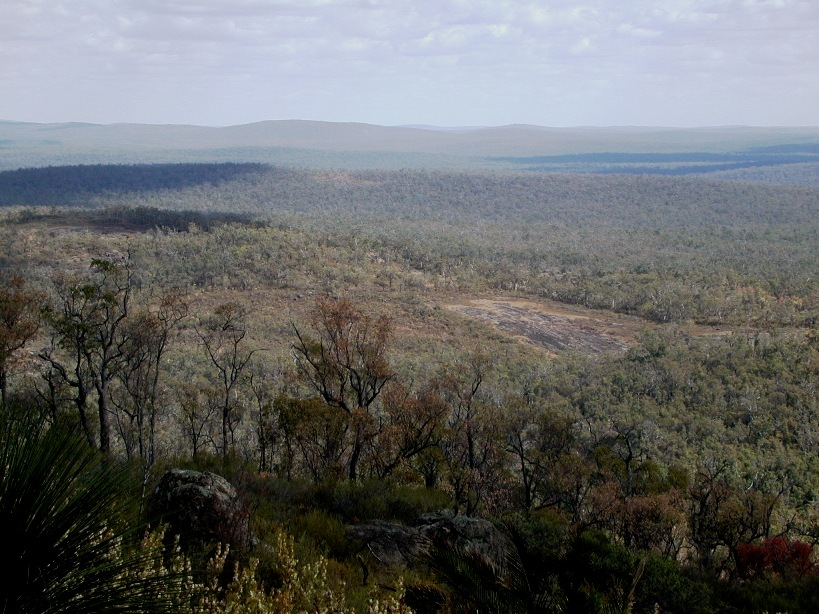
- Mount Dale in Helena National Park

- Location within Western Australia
- Helena National Park (●) is in the City of Kalamunda and the shires of Beverley, York and Mundaring
- Type: National park
- Location: Perth metropolitan and Wheatbelt regions
- Coordinates: 32.077747°S 116.314676°E
- Area: 12,255 hectares (30,280 acres)
- Established: 2004
- Administrator: Department of Biodiversity, Conservation and Attractions

Helena National Park is a national park in the Perth metropolitan and Wheatbelt regions of Western Australia, 70 kilometres (43 mi) south-east of Perth. It is located in the City of Kalamunda and the Shires of Beverley, York and Mundaring. The park is located in the Jarrah Forest bioregion.

Helena National Park was created as Class A reserve No. 47882 on 30 November 2004 with a size of 12,255 hectares (30,280 acres) as one of nine national parks proclaimed in the state that day.

The national park, on land whose traditional owners are the Whadjuk people, is located on the Bibbulmun Track and part of the Perth Hills.
