= Cape Range (South) National Park =

National park in Western Australia

- Location within Western Australia
- Cape Range (South) National Park (●)
- Type: National park
- Location: Gascoyne region
- Coordinates: 22.5886°S 113.7251°E
- Area: 27,072 ha (66,900 acres)
- Established: 2020
- Administrator: Department of Biodiversity, Conservation and Attractions

Cape Range (South) National Park is a national park in the Gascoyne region of Western Australia, 90 kilometres (56 mi) south-west of Exmouth. It was declared on 4 November 2020, is located in the Shire of Exmouth, and is part of the Carnarvon xeric shrublands bioregion. The national park is south of the older and larger Cape Range National Park, which was declared in 1964.
