= Wooditjup National Park =

National park in Western Australia

- Interactive map of Wooditjup National Park
- Type: National park
- Location: South West region
- Coordinates: 33°55′53″S 115°07′21″E
- Area: 3,892 hectares (9,620 acres)
- Established: 2004
- Administrator: Department of Biodiversity, Conservation and Attractions

Wooditjup National Park, formerly Bramley National Park, is a national park in the South West region of Western Australia, 269 km (167 mi) south of Perth. It is located adjacent to the town of Margaret River in the Shire of Augusta-Margaret River. It is located in the Jarrah Forest and Warren bioregions.

Wooditjup National Park was created in 2004 as Class A reserve No. 47956 with a size of 3,892 hectares (9,620 acres) by an act of parliament by the Parliament of Western Australia on 8 December 2004, as one of 19 national parks proclaimed in the state that day.

The national park, on land whose traditional owners are the Wardandi people, was renamed in 2018 from Bramley National Park to Wooditjup National Park in recognition of the traditional owners.
