= Greater Dordagup National Park =

National park in Western Australia

- Location within Western Australia
- Greater Dordagup National Park (●) is a national park in the Shire of Manjimup
- Type: National park
- Location: South West region
- Coordinates: 34.5016°S 116.2883°E
- Area: 6,408 ha (15,830 acres)
- Established: 2004
- Administrator: Department of Biodiversity, Conservation and Attractions

Greater Dordagup National Park is a national park in the South West region of Western Australia, 332 kilometres (206 mi) south of Perth. It is located in the Shire of Manjimup with the South Western Highway running through the park. To the east it borders the much larger Shannon National Park. It is located in the Warren bioregion.

Greater Dordagup National Park was created in 2004 as Class A reserve No. 47663 with a size of 6,408 hectares (15,830 acres) by an act of parliament by the Parliament of Western Australia on 8 December 2004, as one of 19 national parks proclaimed in the state that day.
