= Greater Kingston National Park =

National park in Western Australia

- Location within Western Australia
- Greater Kingston National Park (●) is a national park in the shires of Bridgetown–Greenbushes, Boyup Brook and Manjimup
- Type: National park
- Location: South West region
- Coordinates: 34.1064°S 116.4378°E
- Area: 21,092 ha (52,120 acres)
- Established: 2004
- Administrator: Department of Biodiversity, Conservation and Attractions

Greater Kingston National Park is a national park in the South West region of Western Australia, 308 kilometres (191 mi) south of Perth. It is located in the Shires of Bridgetown–Greenbushes, Boyup Brook and Manjimup. It is located in the Jarrah Forest bioregion.

The national park is located in old growth forest of jarrah and wandoo woodlands.

Greater Kingston National Park was created in 2004 as Class A reserve No. 47762 with a size of 21,092 hectares (52,120 acres) by an act of parliament by the Parliament of Western Australia on 8 December 2004, as one of 19 national parks declared in the state that day.

Greater Kingston is one of only two national parks, alongside Dryandra Woodland, that is a location for an original numbat sub-population. The numbats in the Upper Warren area are present at Greater Kingston National Park and the Tone-Perup Nature Reserve as well as some adjoining State Forest.
