= Greater Hawke National Park =

National park in Western Australia

- Location within Western Australia
- Greater Hawke National Park (●) is a national park in the Shire of Manjimup
- Type: National park
- Location: South West region
- Coordinates: 34.523177°S 115.940162°E
- Area: 14,004 hectares (34,600 acres)
- Established: 2004
- Administrator: Department of Biodiversity, Conservation and Attractions

Greater Hawke National Park, also referred to as Hawke National Park, is a national park in the South West region of Western Australia, 342 kilometres (213 mi) south of Perth. It is located in the Shire of Manjimup. To the south, it borders the much larger D'Entrecasteaux National Park. It is located in the Warren bioregion.

Greater Hawke National Park was created in 2004 as Class A reserve No. 47878 with a size of 14,004 hectares (34,600 acres) by an act of parliament by the Parliament of Western Australia on 8 December 2004, as one of 19 national parks proclaimed in the state that day.

The national park, on land whose traditional owners are the Bibulman people, is located in old growth forest and has two campsites.
