= Goldfields Woodlands National Park =

National park in Western Australia

- Location within Western Australia
- Goldfields Woodlands National Park (●) is a national park the Shire of Coolgardie
- Type: National park
- Location: Goldfields–Esperance region
- Coordinates: 31.2147°S 120.5374°E
- Area: 64,628 ha (159,700 acres)
- Established: 2000
- Administrator: Department of Biodiversity, Conservation and Attractions

Goldfields Woodlands National Park is a national park in the Goldfields-Esperance region of Western Australia, 474 kilometres (295 mi) east of Perth and 120 km (75 mi) west of Kalgoorlie, in the Shire of Coolgardie. The park borders the Boorabbin National Park in the west and is situated along the Great Eastern Highway. It is located in the Coolgardie bioregion.

The Goldfields Woodlands National Park was created on 14 April 2000 with a size of 64,628 hectares (159,700 acres). The Goldfields Woodlands Conservation Park is adjacent to the east of the national park.

The national park, on land whose traditional owners are the Kalaamaya people, is part of the Great Western Woodlands. Apart from its natural features, the park also serves to preserve the human history of the region, both indigenous and contemporary. The Holland Track and the Goldfields Water Supply Scheme pass through the park.
