= Greater Preston National Park =

National park in Western Australia

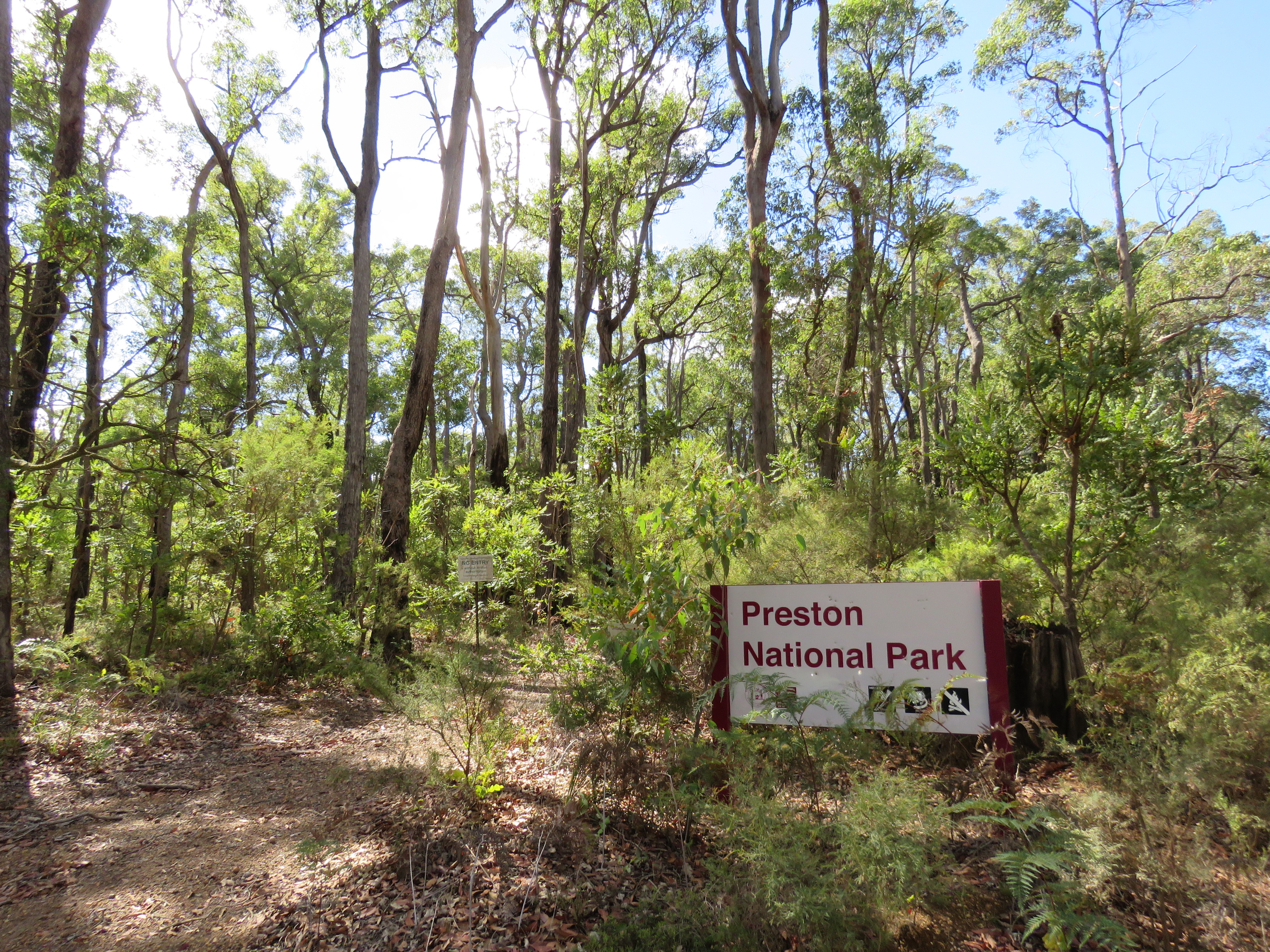
- Park border sign on the Lowden-Grimwade Road, in the north-west of the park

- Location within Western Australia
- Greater Preston National Park (●) is in the shires of Boyup Brook, Donnybrook–Balingup, Collie and West Arthur
- Type: National park
- Location: South West region
- Coordinates: 33.5716°S 116.1923°E
- Area: 11,373 ha (28,100 acres)
- Established: 2004
- Administrator: Department of Biodiversity, Conservation and Attractions

Greater Preston National Park, sometimes referred to as just Preston National Park, is a national park in the South West region of Western Australia, 222 kilometres (138 mi) south of Perth. It is predominantly located in the Shire of Boyup Brook and Shire of Donnybrook–Balingup, with the north-eastern corner of the national park also reaching into the Shire of Collie and Shire of West Arthur. It is located in the Jarrah Forest bioregion.

Greater Preston National Park was created in 2004 as Class A reserve No. 47661 with a size of 11,373 hectares (28,100 acres) by an act of parliament by the Parliament of Western Australia on 8 December 2004, as one of 19 national parks declared in the state that day.

The national park, on land whose traditional owners are the Kaniyang and Wiilman people, is split into roughly equal parts either side of the Donnybrook-Boyup Brook Road. It has no facilities but the Bibbulmun Track runs through the western part of the national park. Its main feature is old growth jarrah forest and wildflowers in spring.
