= Mundy Regional Park =

Regional park in Western Australia

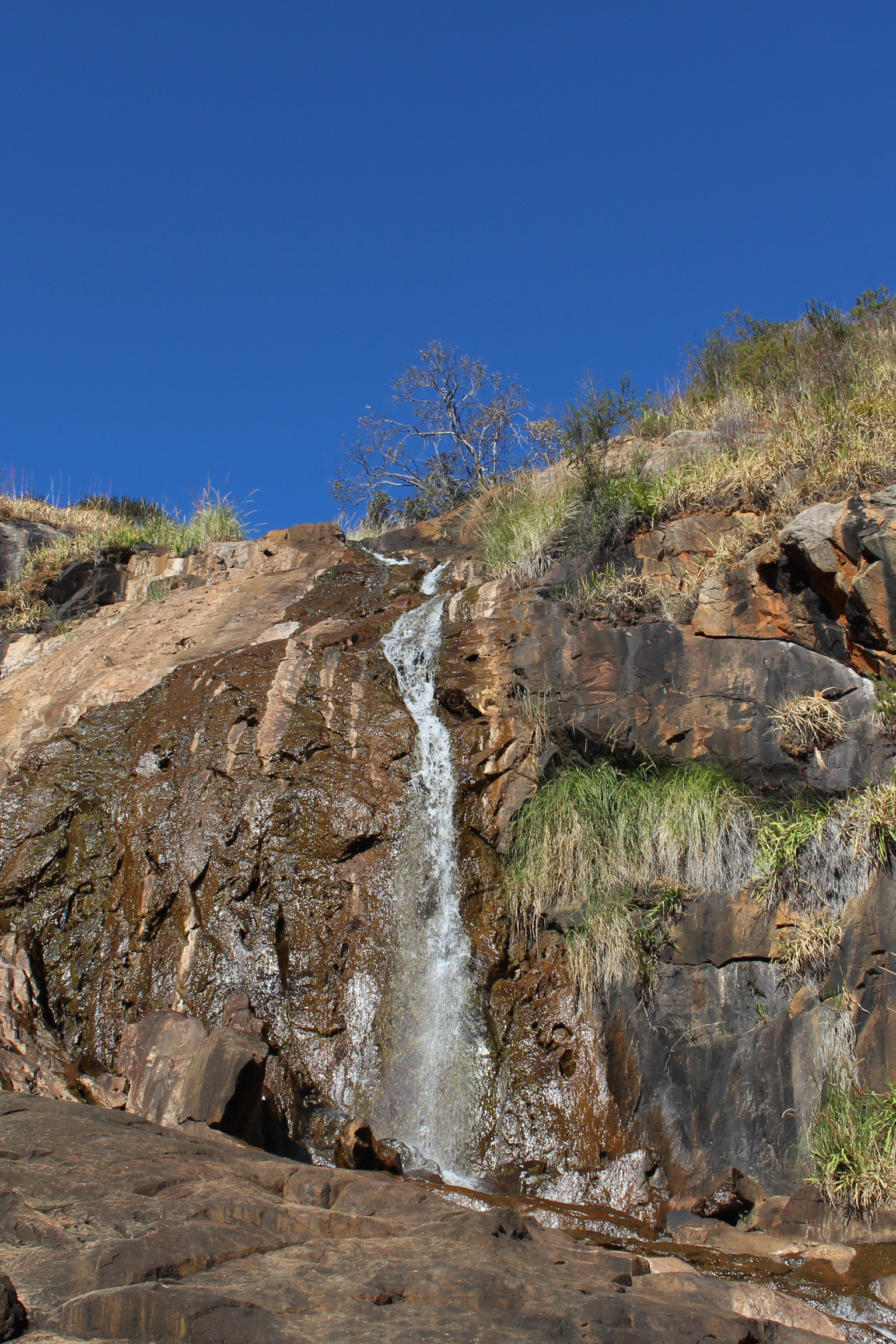
- Lesmurdie Falls, located within the park

- Location within Western Australia
- Mundy Regional Park (●) is on the western edge of the Darling Scarp
- Type: Regional park
- Coordinates: 31.9859°S 116.0347°E
- Area: 56 ha (138 acres)
- Established: 1957
- Operator: Department of Parks and Wildlife
- Website: Mundy Regional Park at Department of Parks and Wildlife

The Mundy Regional Park is a regional park located on the western edge of the Darling Scarp, approximately 22 kilometres (14 mi) east of Perth in Western Australia. The 56-hectare (140-acre) park has commanding views of the Swan Coastal Plain, the city of Perth and surrounding suburbs. The park is managed by the Department of Biodiversity, Conservation and Attractions.

== Location and features ==
The park contains the 50-metre (164 ft) Lesmurdie Falls, formed by Lesmurdie Brook emptying over the Scarp, and the surrounding riparian and heath vegetation. Wandoo, jarrah and marri trees can all be found within the park. A gravity hill exists near the carpark on Palm Terrace.

The Mundy Regional Park has multiple walking and running trails of varying difficulty and is popular for walking and running. The walking trails include: Lesmurdie Brook Loop, Lewis Road Walk, Palm Terrace Walk, Xanthorrhoea Trail, Whistlepipe Gully.

Some sections allow horse riding and off-road cycling.

== Gallery ==
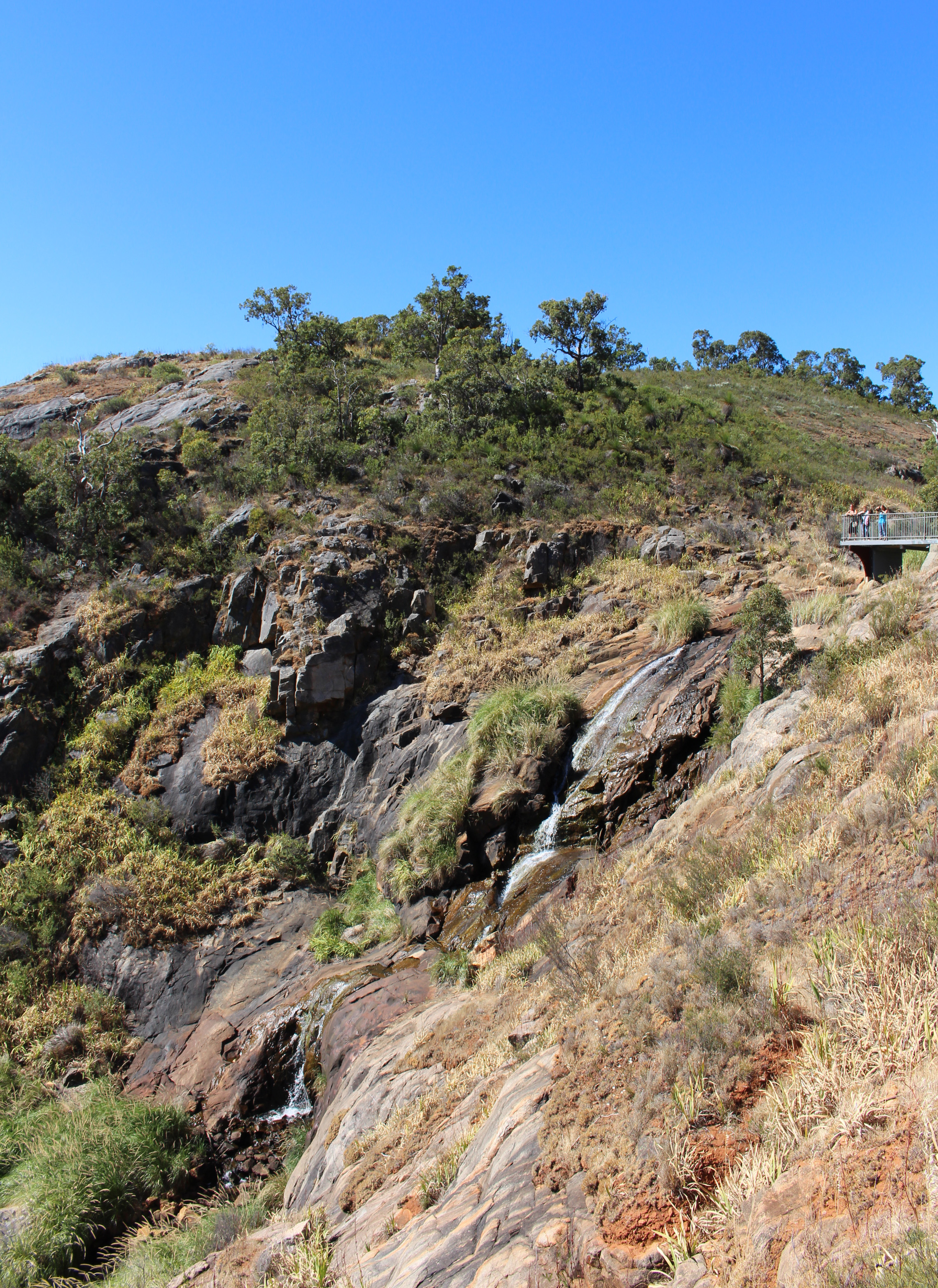

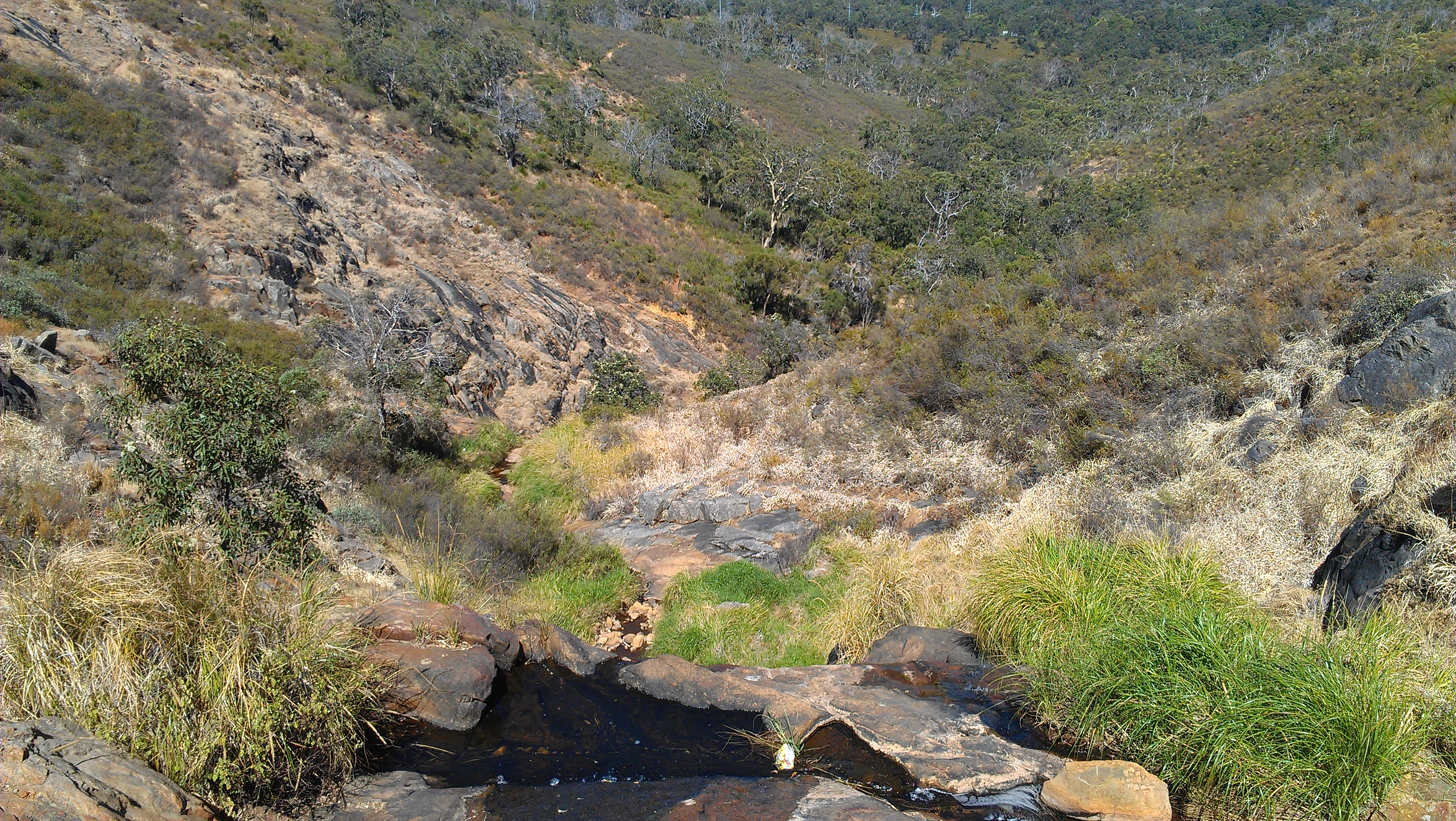

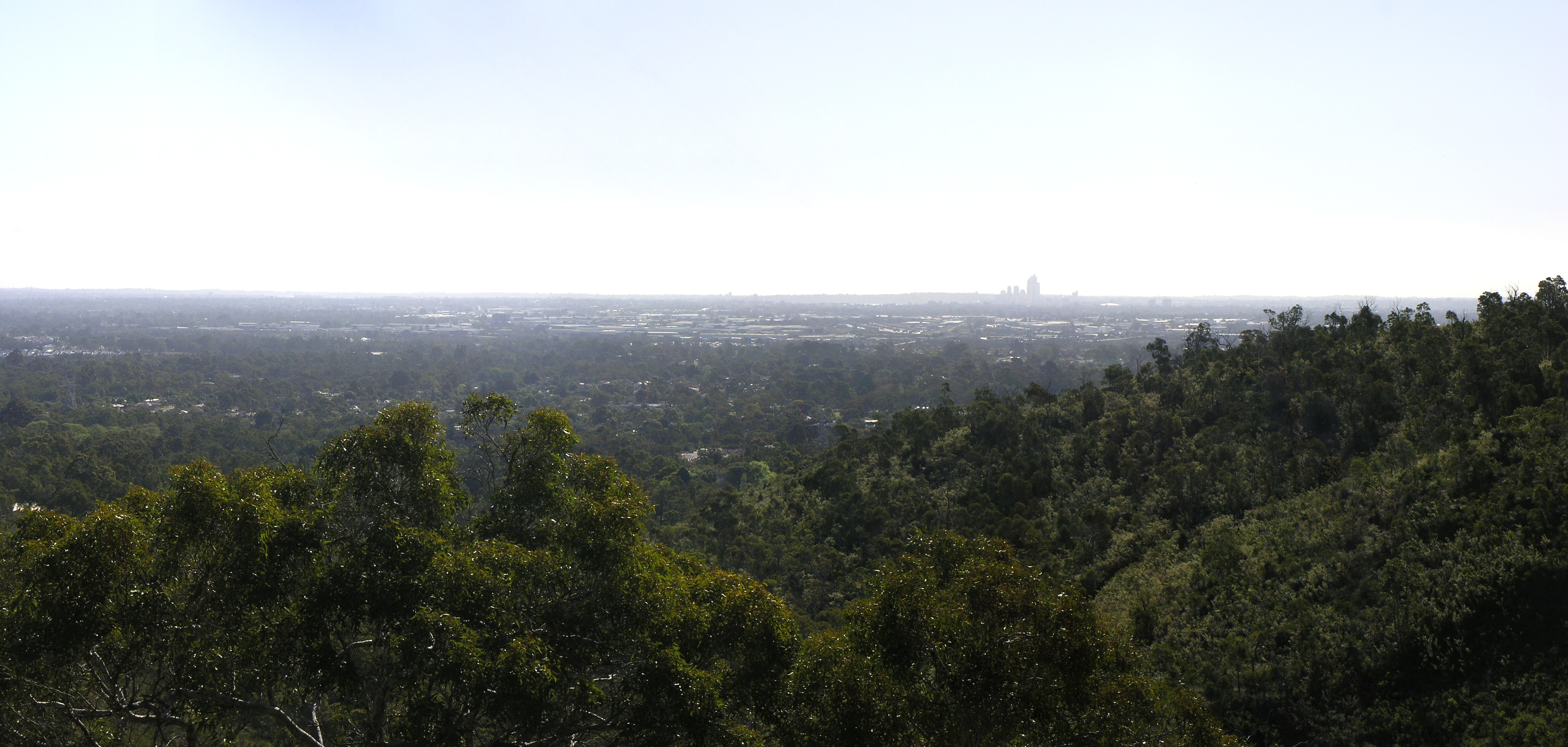

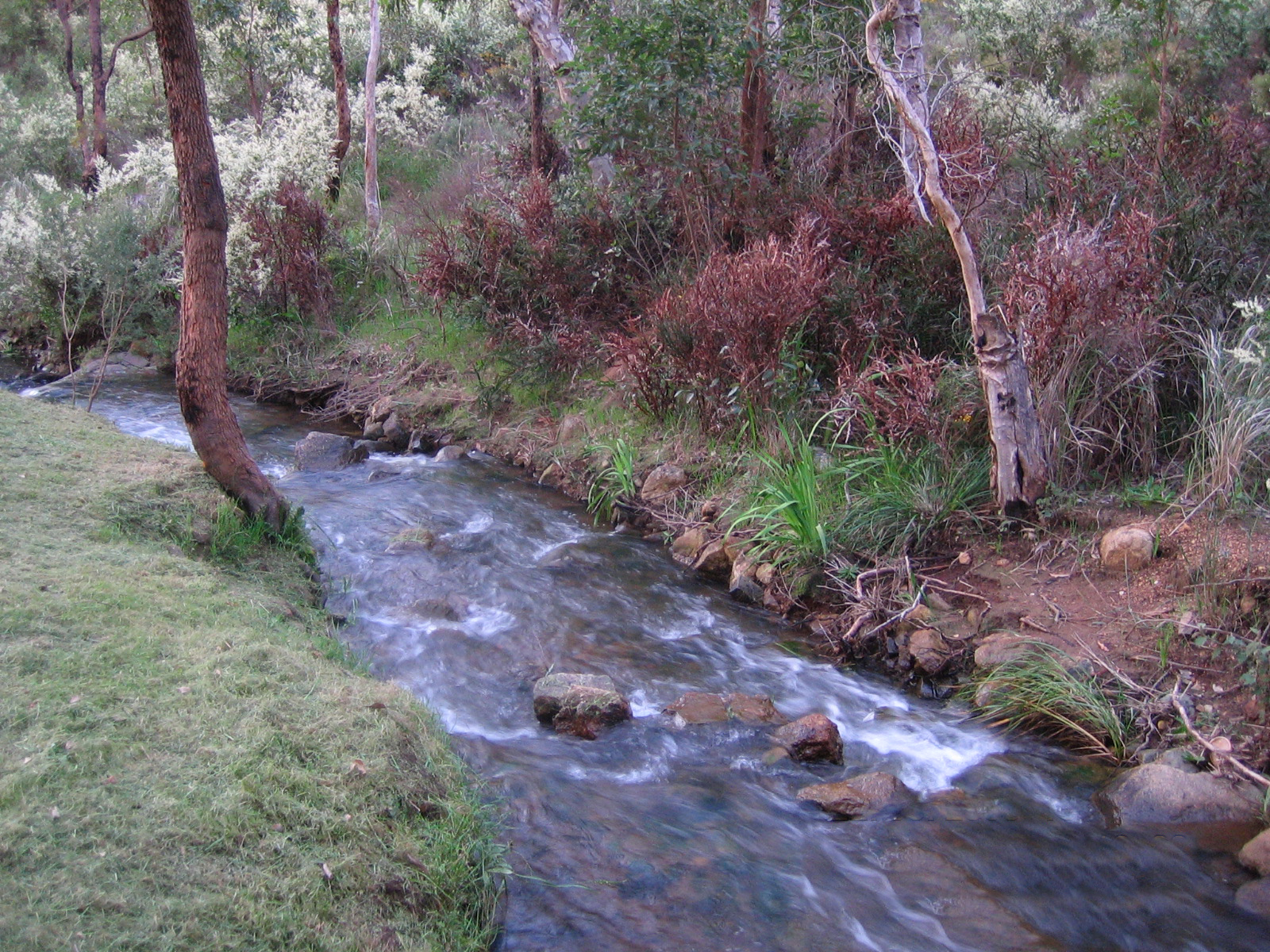

== See also ==
- Forrestfield, Western Australia
- Lesmurdie, Western Australia
- List of waterfalls in Australia
