= Boorara-Gardner National Park =

National park in Western Australia

- Location within Western Australia
- Boorara-Gardner National Park (●)
- Type: National park
- Location: South West region
- Coordinates: 34.7115°S 116.1867°E
- Area: 11,008 ha (27,200 acres)
- Established: 2004
- Administrator: Department of Biodiversity, Conservation and Attractions

Boorara-Gardner National Park is a national park in the South West region of Western Australia, 360 kilometres (220 mi) south of Perth. It is located in the Shire of Manjimup and borders D'Entrecasteaux National Park and Shannon National Park.

Boorara-Gardner National Park was created in 2004 as Class A reserve No. 47665 with a size of 11,008 hectares (27,200 acres) by an act of parliament by the Parliament of Western Australia on 8 December 2004, as one of 19 national parks proclaimed in the state that day.

The national park, on land whose traditional owners are the Bibulman people, features mainly old growth forest and wildflowers in spring. it is home to the Boorara Tree, which houses a now disused fire lookout built in the 1950.
