= Lakeside National Park =

National park in Western Australia

- Location within Western Australia
- Lakeside National Park (●) is in the Shire of Cue
- Type: National park
- Location: Mid West region
- Coordinates: 27.6467°S 117.5152°E
- Area: 8,490 ha (21,000 acres)
- Established: 2021
- Administrator: Department of Biodiversity, Conservation and Attractions

Lakeside National Park is a national park in the Mid West region of Western Australia, 50 kilometres (31 mi) south-west of Cue. It was declared on 18 February 2021, is located in the Shire of Cue, and is part of the Murchison bioregion.
