= Warlibirri National Park =

National park in Western Australia

- Interactive map of Warlibirri National Park
- Type: National park
- Location: Kimberley region
- Coordinates: 18°15′26″S 126°21′35″E
- Area: 15,895 hectares (39,280 acres)
- Administrator: Department of Biodiversity, Conservation and Attractions Gooniyandi Aboriginal Corporation

Warlibirri National Park is a national park in the Kimberley region of Western Australia, stretching along the Margaret River east of Fitzroy Crossing. It was declared on 22 September 2021, is located in the Shires of Derby-West Kimberley and Halls Creek, and is part of the Central Kimberley and Dampierland bioregions.

The national park is located on the traditional land of the Gooniyandi people and is jointly managed by the Gooniyandi Aboriginal Corporation and the Department of Biodiversity, Conservation and Attractions.

The national park is named after the word Gooniyandi for river, Warlibirri. The creation of national park was seen as a step towards protecting the river valley from mining and damming the river and additional national parks connecting Warlibirri with Geikie Gorge and Danggu Gorge National Park were planned.
