= List of rare flora of the Warren region =

Endangered plants in Western Australia

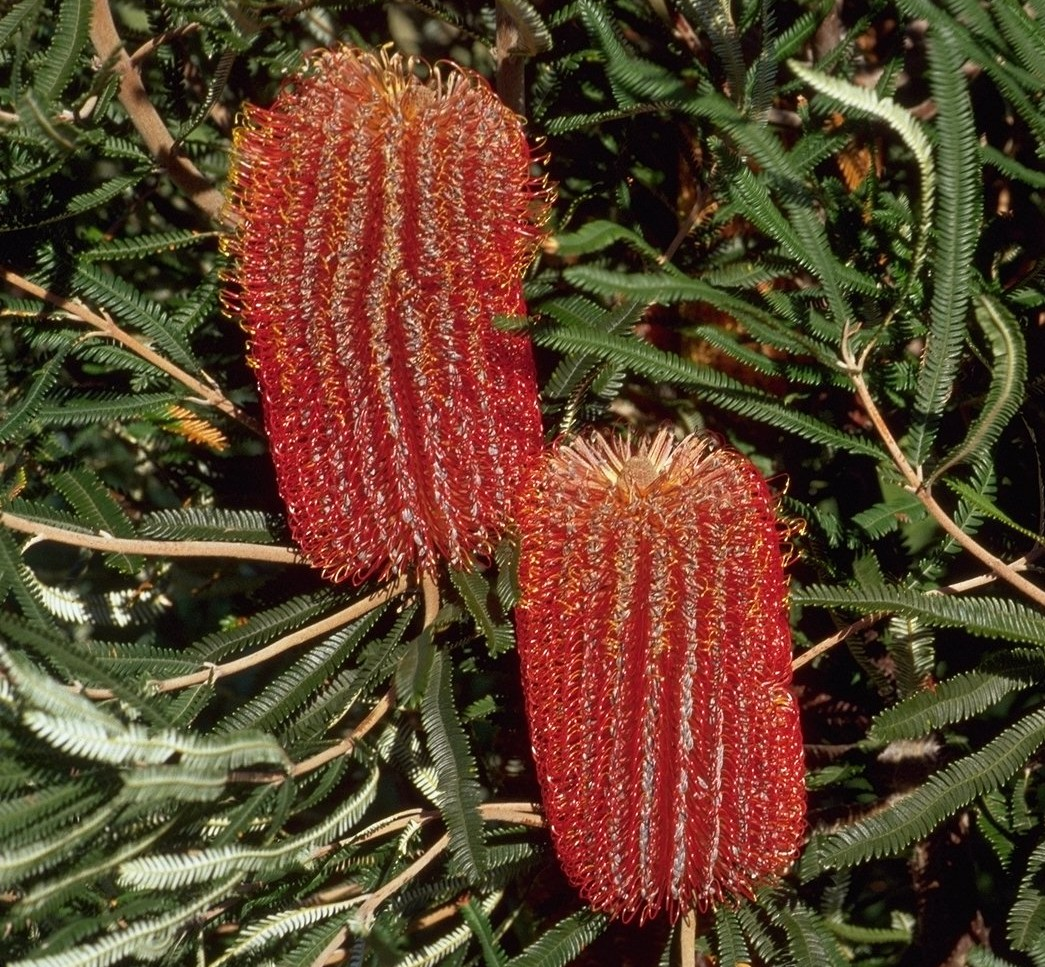
The endangered Banksia brownii (Feather-leaved Banksia) occurs in the Warren region.

This is a list of endangered flora of the Warren region, a biogeographic region or bioregion in southern Western Australia. It includes all taxa that occur in the region, and that have been classified as "R: Declared Rare Flora - Extant Taxa" or "X: Declared Rare Flora - Presumed Extinct Taxa" under the Department of Environment and Conservation's Declared Rare and Priority Flora List, and are hence gazetted as endangered extant flora under the Wildlife Conservation Act 1950.

There are 28 endangered taxa. Leucopogon cryptanthus is presumed extinct. The other 27 are believed extant:

- Asplenium obtusatum subsp. northlandicum
- Banksia brownii (Feather-leaved Banksia)
- Banksia verticillata (Albany Banksia)
- Boronia exilis
- Brachyscias verecundus
- Caladenia christineae
- Caladenia excelsa
- Caladenia harringtoniae
- Caladenia winfieldii
- Calectasia cyanea (Blue Tinsel Lily)
- Darwinia ferricola ms
- Diuris drummondii (Tall Donkey Orchid)
- Drakaea micrantha
- Dryandra nivea subsp. uliginosa
- Epiblema grandiflorum var. cyaneum ms (Blue Babe-in-a-cradle)
- Grevillea brachystylis subsp. australis
- Hydatella dioica (Swan Hydatella)
- Isopogon uncinatus
- Kennedia glabrata (Northcliffe Kennedia)
- Kennedia lateritia (Augusta Kennedia)
- Lambertia orbifolia subsp. Scott River Plains
- Meziella trifida
- Microtis globula (South-coast Mignonette Orchid)
- Reedia spathacea
- Sphenotoma drummondii (Mountain Paper-heath)
- Verticordia fimbrilepis subsp. australis
- Verticordia plumosa var. vassensis
