= Lake Muir Nature Reserve =

Protected area in Western Australia

- IUCN category Ia (strict nature reserve)
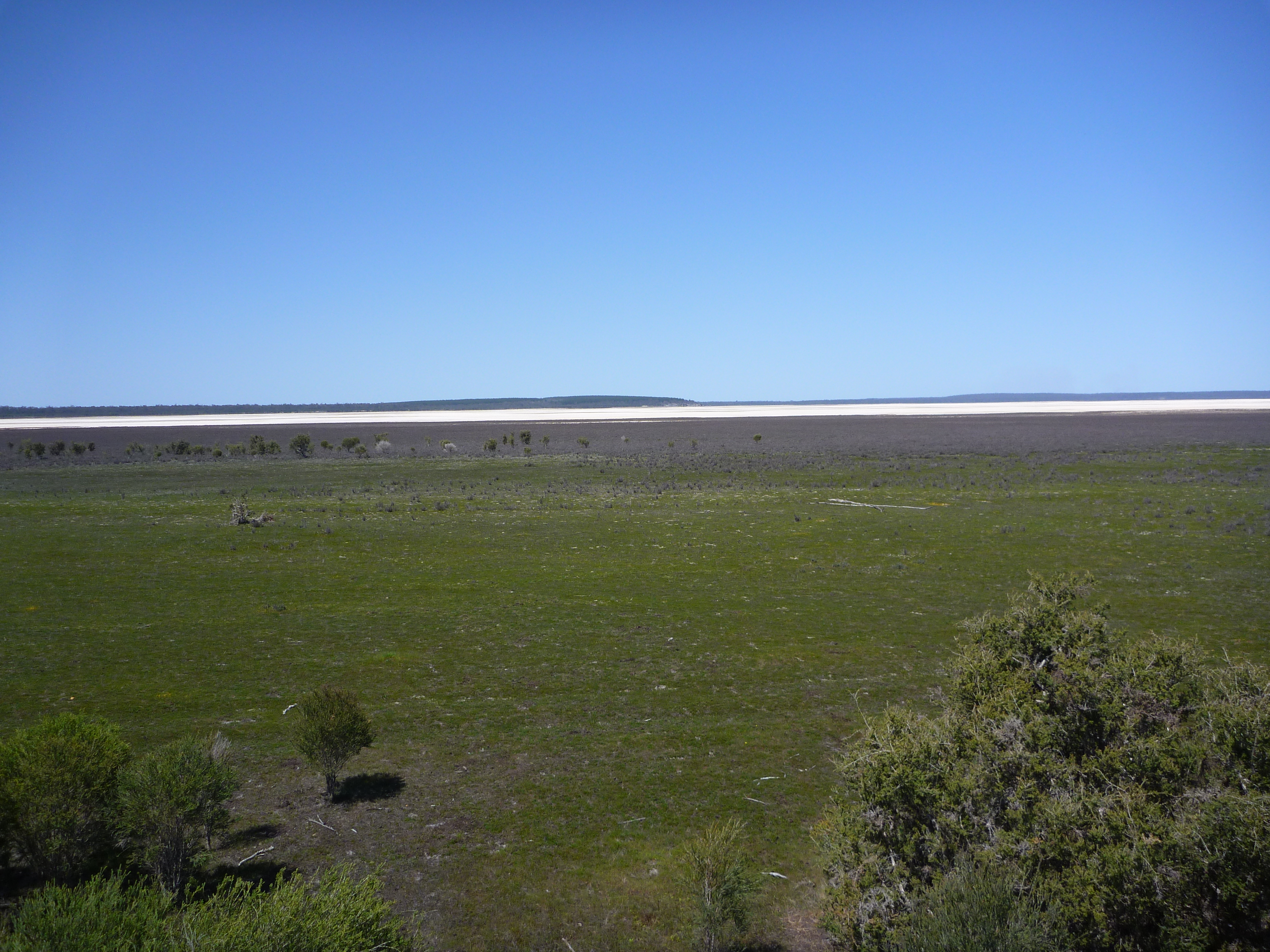
- Photo of Lake Muir from the Lake Muir Observatory

- Location within Western Australia
- Location: shires of Manjimup and Cranbook, South West region, Western Australia
- Coordinates: 34°28′S 116°43′E
- Area: 113.11 km^{2} (43.67 sq mi)
- Designation: Nature reserve
- Established: 2001

Ramsar Wetland
- Official name: Muir-Byenup System
- Designated: 5 January 2001
- Reference no.: 1050

Lake Muir Nature Reserve is a protected area in Western Australia. It encompasses Lake Muir and several smaller lakes and wetlands. It is an important refuge for water birds, and home to several rare plants and plant communities.

== Geography ==
The reserve is located in the South West region, in the shires of Manjimup and Cranbook, 55 km south east of Manjimup.

The lakes and swamps form a partly-interconnected system. They vary in size, with Lake Muir the largest. The lakes and swamps also vary in salinity, from freshwater to saline, and include both seasonal and permanent wetlands on peat and inorganic substrates.

Muir Highway passes through the northern end of the reserve, north of Lake Muir. Lake Muir Observatory is located off the highway at the north end of the lake. It has an observatory and 110-metre boardwalk for viewing the lake along with shelter, picnic tables, and toilets, and is a popular rest stop for travelers.

The reserve is bounded on the south by Lake Muir National Park.

== Flora and fauna ==
The reserve protects several wetland plant communities which are now rare outside coastal Southwest Australia. The swamps are mostly dominated by sedges and shrubs, and the reserve includes the largest natural sedgelands in Western Australia. The swamps are home to three species of nationally vulnerable orchids – Harrington's spider orchid (Caladenia harringtoniae), Christine's spider orchid (Caladenia christineae), and the tall donkey orchid (Diuris drummondii). It is also the location of a localized Kunzea species Kunzea micrantha. The open lakes are used for moulting by thousands of Australian shelduck (Tadorna tadornoides), and provide a drought refuge for tens of thousands of ducks and other water birds, including Australian little bittern (Ixobrychus dubius), spotless crake (Zapornia tabuensis), black swan (Cygnus atratus), and eurasian coot (Fulica atra). The swamps support a significant population of Australasian bittern (Botaurus poiciloptilus).

Vulnerable fauna present in the reserve include Balston's pygmy perch (Nannatherina balstoni), Muir's corella (Cacatua pastinator pastinator), forest red-tailed black cockatoo (Calyptorhynchus banksii), chuditch (Dasyurus geoffroii), numbat (Myrmecobius fasciatus), woylie (Bettongia penicillata), and quokka (Setonix brachyurus).

== Conservation ==
The reserve was designated in 2001. It was designated a wetland of international importance under the Ramsar Convention in the same year. The Ramsar site covers an area of 10,631 ha.
