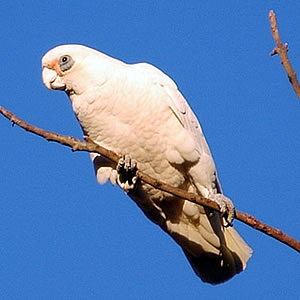
- Little corella

Scientific classification
- Kingdom: Animalia
- Phylum: Chordata
- Class: Aves
- Order: Psittaciformes
- Family: Cacatuidae
- Genus: Cacatua
- Subgenus: Licmetis

Species
- 6, see text

= Corella (bird) =

Subgenus of birds

Licmetis is a subgenus of the white cockatoos (genus Cacatua). They are collectively known as corellas or crestless cockatoos in Australia. Three of the six species are primarily – or only – found in Australia, while the Philippines, Indonesia, and the Solomons each have an endemic species. They are relatively small cockatoos and – unlike the members of the subgenus Cacatua – all have pale bills. While most show yellow-tinged underwings and some red to the face, none has conspicuously coloured crests.

== Species ==
- Long-billed corella, Cacatua (Licmetis) tenuirostris
- Western corella, Cacatua (Licmetis) pastinator
  - Muir's corella, Cacatua (Licmetis) pastinator pastinator
  - Butler's corella, Cacatua (Licmetis) pastinator butleri
- Little corella, Cacatua (Licmetis) sanguinea
- Red-vented cockatoo, Cacatua (Licmetis) haematuropygia
- Tanimbar corella, Cacatua (Licmetis) goffiniana
- Solomons cockatoo, Cacatua (Licmetis) ducorpsii
