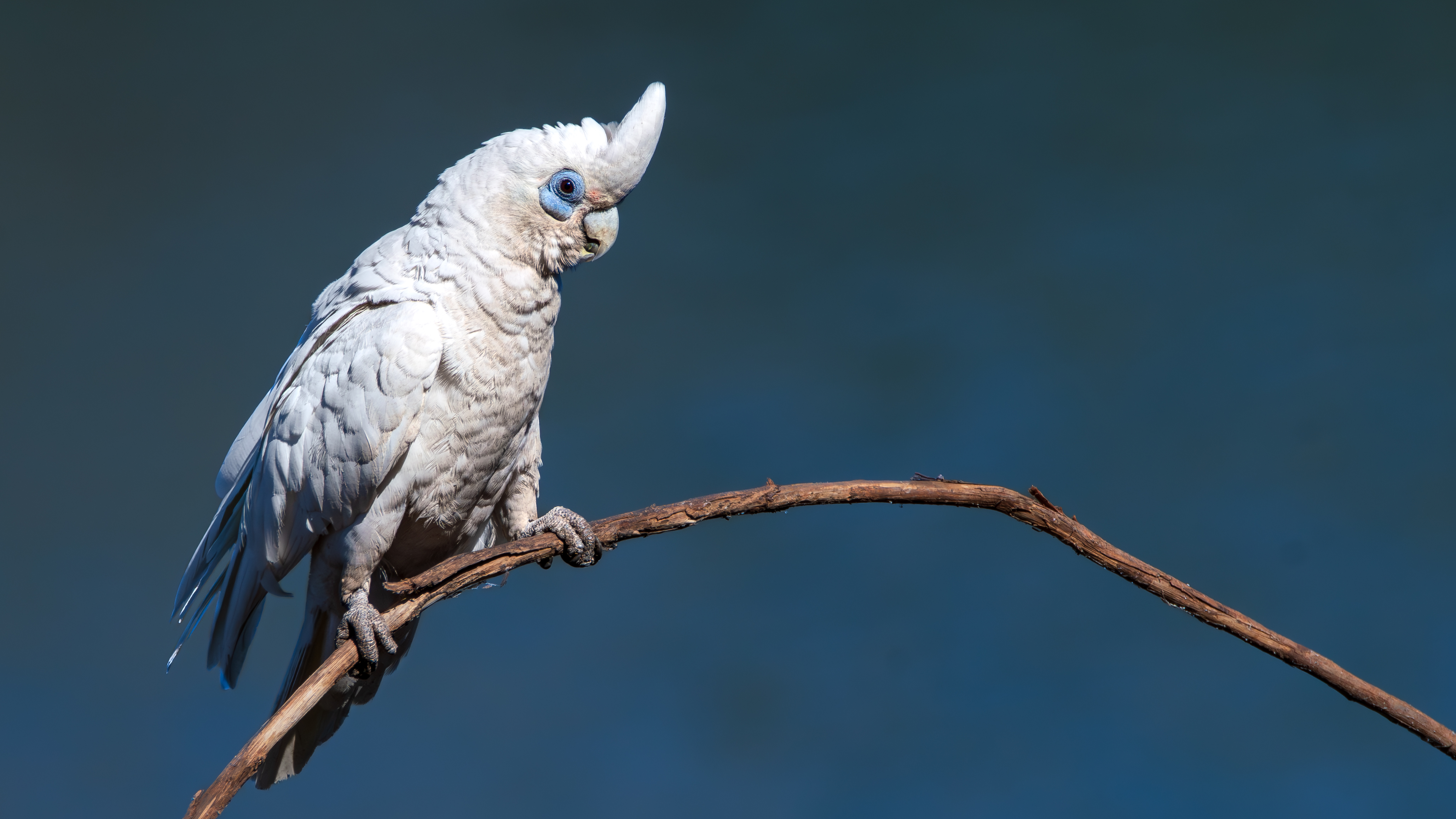
- Little corella (Cacatua sanguinea)

Conservation status
- Least Concern (IUCN 3.1)

Scientific classification
- Kingdom: Animalia
- Phylum: Chordata
- Class: Aves
- Order: Psittaciformes
- Family: Cacatuidae
- Genus: Cacatua
- Subgenus: Licmetis
- Species: C. sanguinea

Binomial name
- Cacatua sanguinea Gould, 1843

Subspecies
- C. s. sanguinea C. s. normantoni C. s. transfreta C. s. gymnopis

= Little corella =

Species of bird

The little corella (Cacatua sanguinea), also known as the short-billed corella, bare-eyed cockatoo, blood-stained cockatoo, and little cockatoo is a white cockatoo native to Australia and southern New Guinea. It was known as Birdirra among the Yindjibarndi people of the central and western Pilbara. They would keep them as pets, or traditionally cook and eat them. The downy feathers are used in traditional ceremonies and dances where they adorn head and armbands.

== Taxonomy ==
The first recorded description of the species was by English ornithologist John Gould in 1843. There are four subspecies as follows:

- C. s. sanguinea
- C. s. normantoni
- C. s. transfreta
- C. s. gymnopis
- C. s. westralensis (Mathews, 1917)
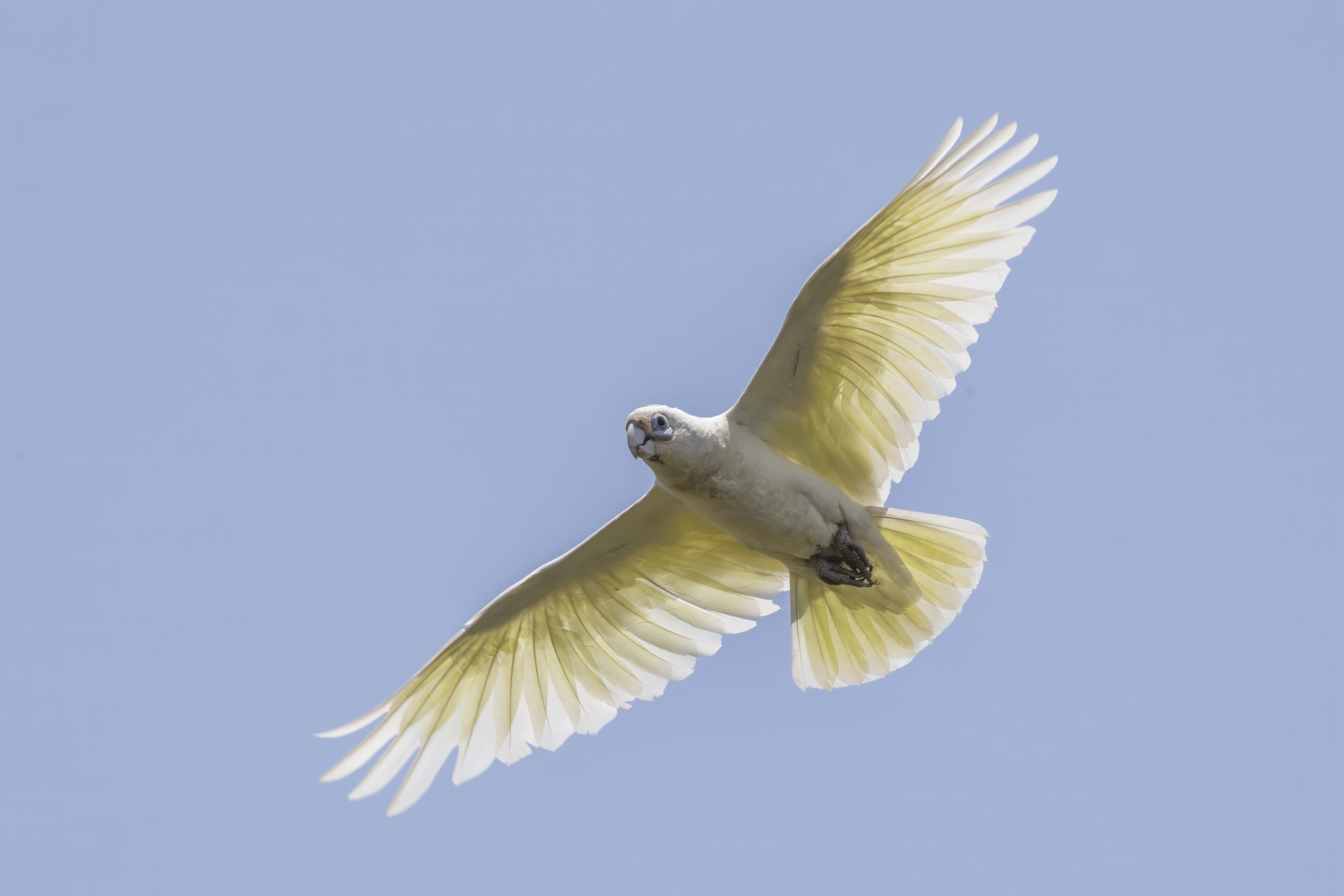
C. s. sanguinea, Northern Territory

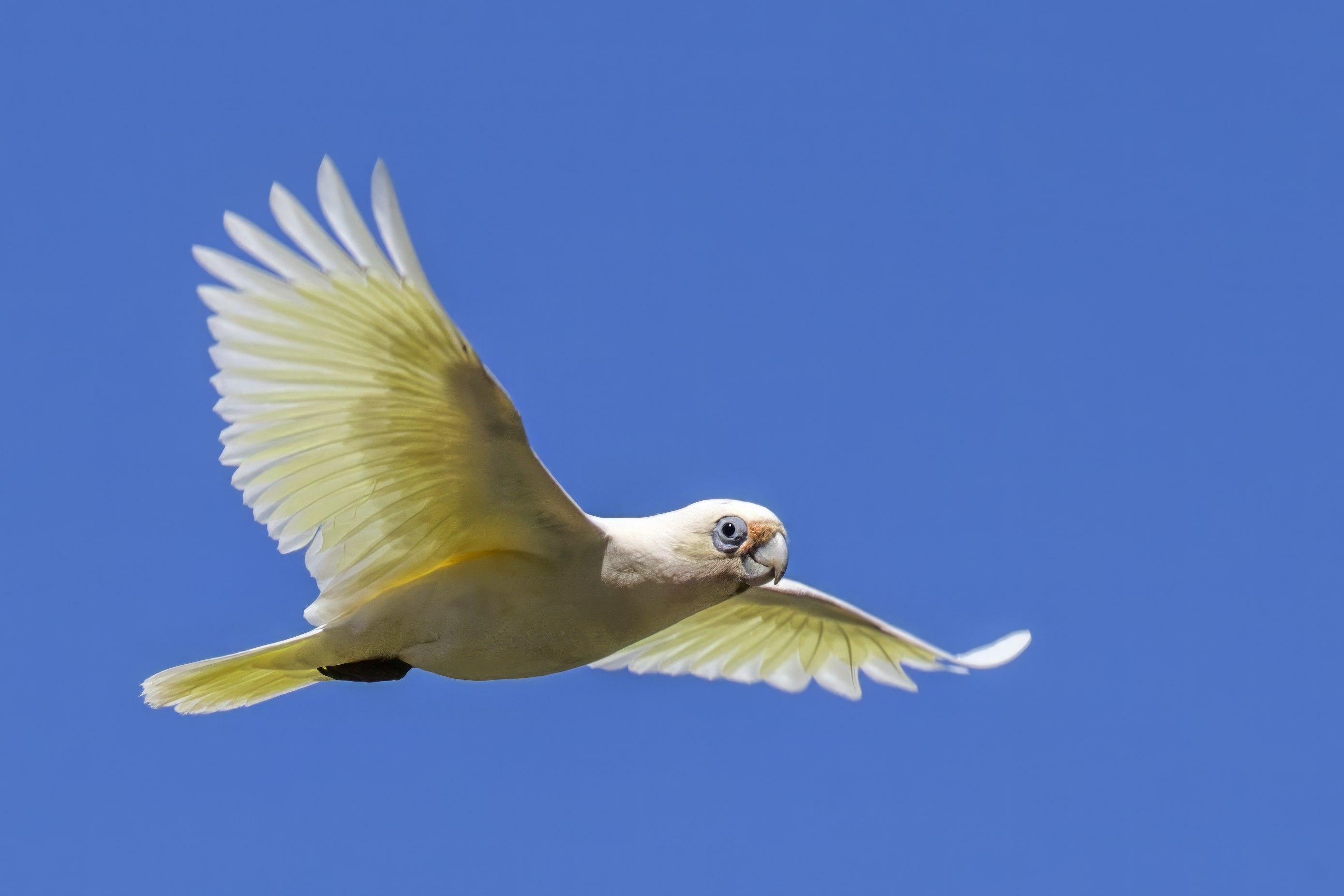
C. s. gymnopis, South Australia

== Description ==
The little corella is a small white cockatoo growing to 35–41 cm (14–16 in) in length and weighs 370–630 g (13–22 oz), with a mean weight of 525 g (1.157 lb). It is similar in appearance to both the long-billed corella and the western corella, but the little corella is smaller, and unlike either of those species, it has upper and lower mandibles of similar length. It is easily distinguished from the long-billed corella by the lack of an orange throat bar. C. s. normantoni and C. s. transfreta are a little smaller than the nominate form. C. s. normantoni is lightly brownish on the underside of flight and tail feathers. C. s. gymnopis has darker blue eye-rings, more strongly marked pink lores and a yellow wash to the lower-ear coverts. Females are slightly smaller than males in weight, wing length, culmen size, tarsus length, tail length and eye ring diameter.

== Distribution and habitat ==
The little corella is native to mainland Australia, in a broad arc from eastern South Australia through Victoria, New South Wales, Queensland and the Northern Territory around to coastal Western Australia. It is also native to southern New Guinea and has been introduced to Tasmania. The nominate form, C. s. sanguinea is found in Northern Australia. C. s. normantoni is found on the Western Cape York Peninsula. C. s. transfreta is found in New Guinea. C. s. gymnopis is found in Central, Eastern, and South-eastern Australia. Its habitat includes savanna, shrubs and grasses as well as urban settings. This ranges from the arid deserts of central Australia to the eastern coastal plains, but they are not found in thick forests. Little corellas can also be found in urban areas, including Melbourne, Canberra, Sydney and Brisbane, where they feed on lawns and playing fields. They are numerous in farmlands throughout New South Wales and Queensland, and have become so common in some areas that they are considered to be crop pests, and can be destructive to the trees in which they perch, by chewing the bark off smaller twigs.

== Behaviour ==
Little corellas congregate in flocks of up to several thousand, which often include other birds such as galahs, sulphur-crested cockatoos and red-tailed black cockatoos. They generally roost in trees overnight, and fly off to feed in the early morning before returning in the late evening. Flocks will often fly many kilometres between their feeding and roosting areas, and in desert areas must also fly to watering holes twice a day, while corellas which live in coastal areas do not have to fly long distances to find water.

=== Call ===
The call consists of high pitched notes and screeches somewhat similar to the sulphur-crested cockatoo. Large flocks will call simultaneously and can create a deafening screeching sound audible from several kilometers away.

=== Breeding ===
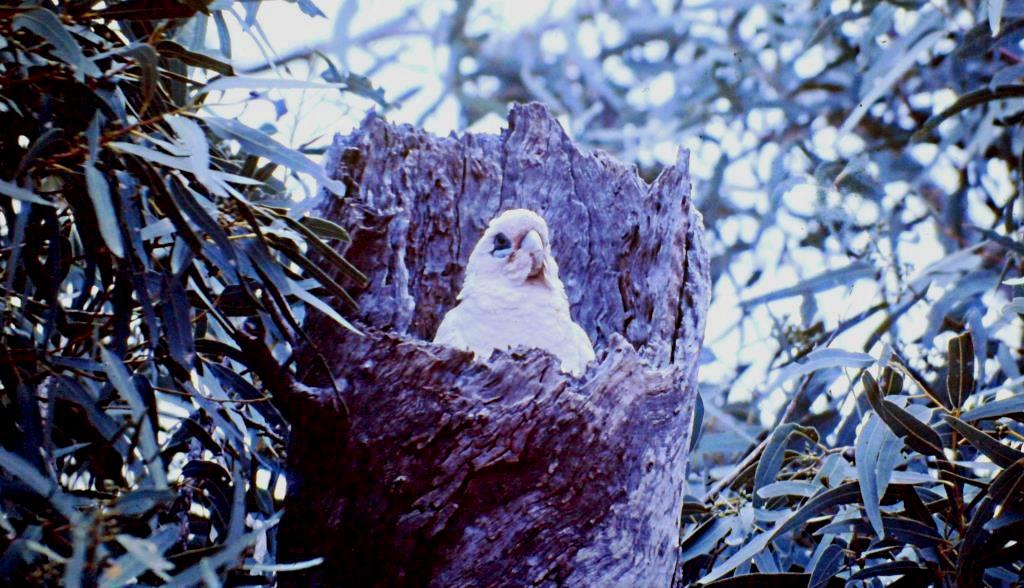
Little corella on nest. Near Tibooburra, New South Wales

Breeding occurs from May to October, and usually takes place earlier in the north of its range. The nest is usually in a tree hollow, cliff cavity or termite mound.

=== Feeding ===
Little corellas usually feed on the ground, however occasionally feed in trees and shrubs. They eat a variety of both wild and cultivated seeds and regularly feed on lawn grasses in urban areas. They frequently feed on cereal crops such as wheat, barley and maize and can become a considerable agricultural pest in some areas.

=== Playing ===
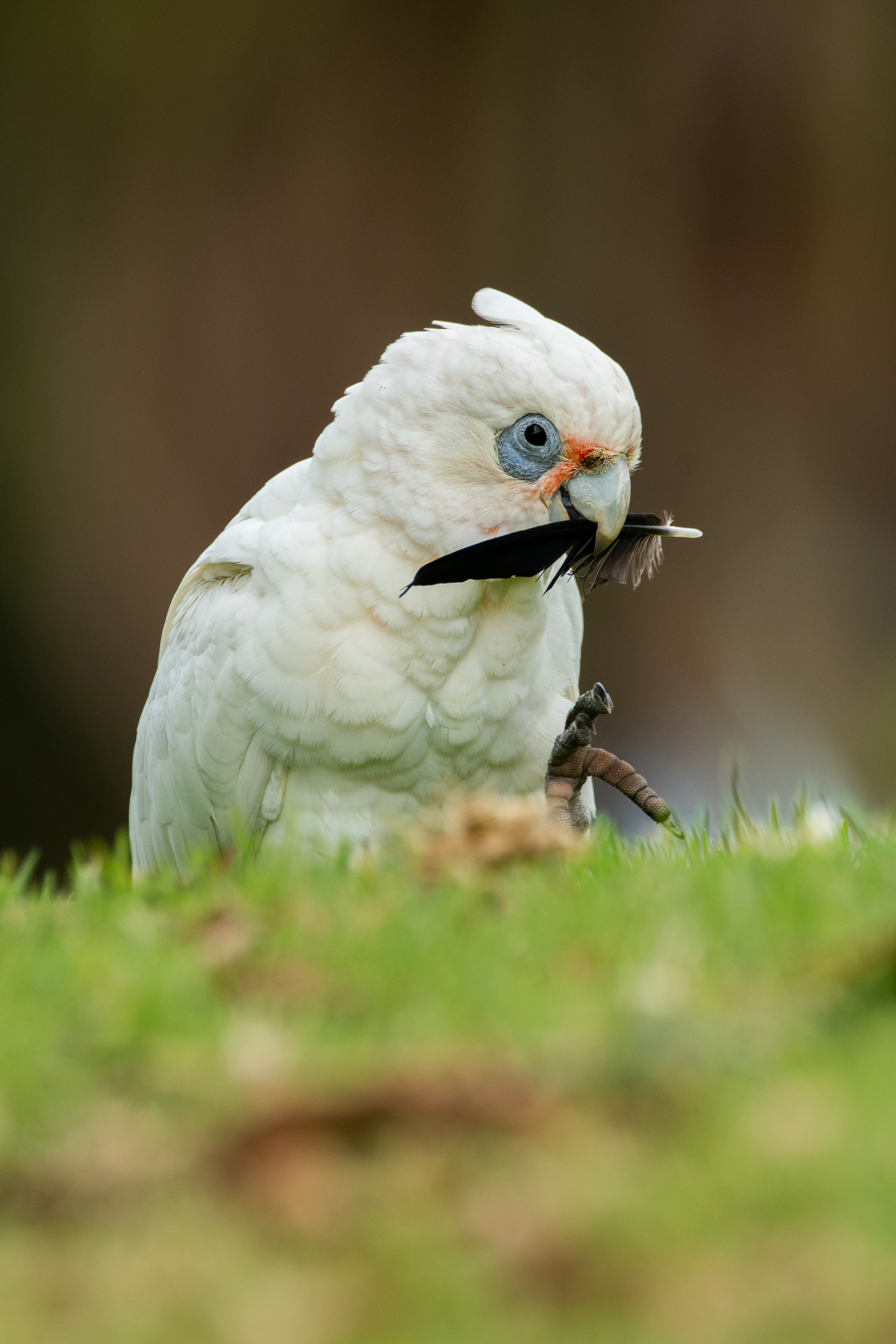
Little corella playing with a feather

When little corellas play, they become very noisy. They have conversations with each other, fly around and also show off. Little corellas show off by hanging themselves upside-down with their feet, beaks or both.

== Relationship to humans ==
In the state of South Australia, little corellas are considered "unprotected native fauna" and may be shot (without a permit), trapped or gassed (with a permit) by landowners. Permits are also available to take a limited number of little corellas from the wild each year for avicultural purposes.

== Threats ==
In July 2019, in a scene that was said to resemble a "horror movie", about 60 corellas in Adelaide, South Australia, died in a suspected case of poisoning, after "falling from the sky", bleeding from their mouths, and wailing. At least 57 of the birds were long-billed corellas, with the rest being short-billed corellas. It was hoped that whoever poisoned them would get traced after a toxicology report, since Australia requires registration for purchasing poisons. The testing could, however, take several weeks to complete. Additionally, the local Alexandrina council had, beforehand, called for short-billed corellas to be culled for damaging crops and chewing on streetlights, damaging built infrastructure such as buildings and sporting equipment, and displacing other native species of birds and bees, possums, and other organisms.
