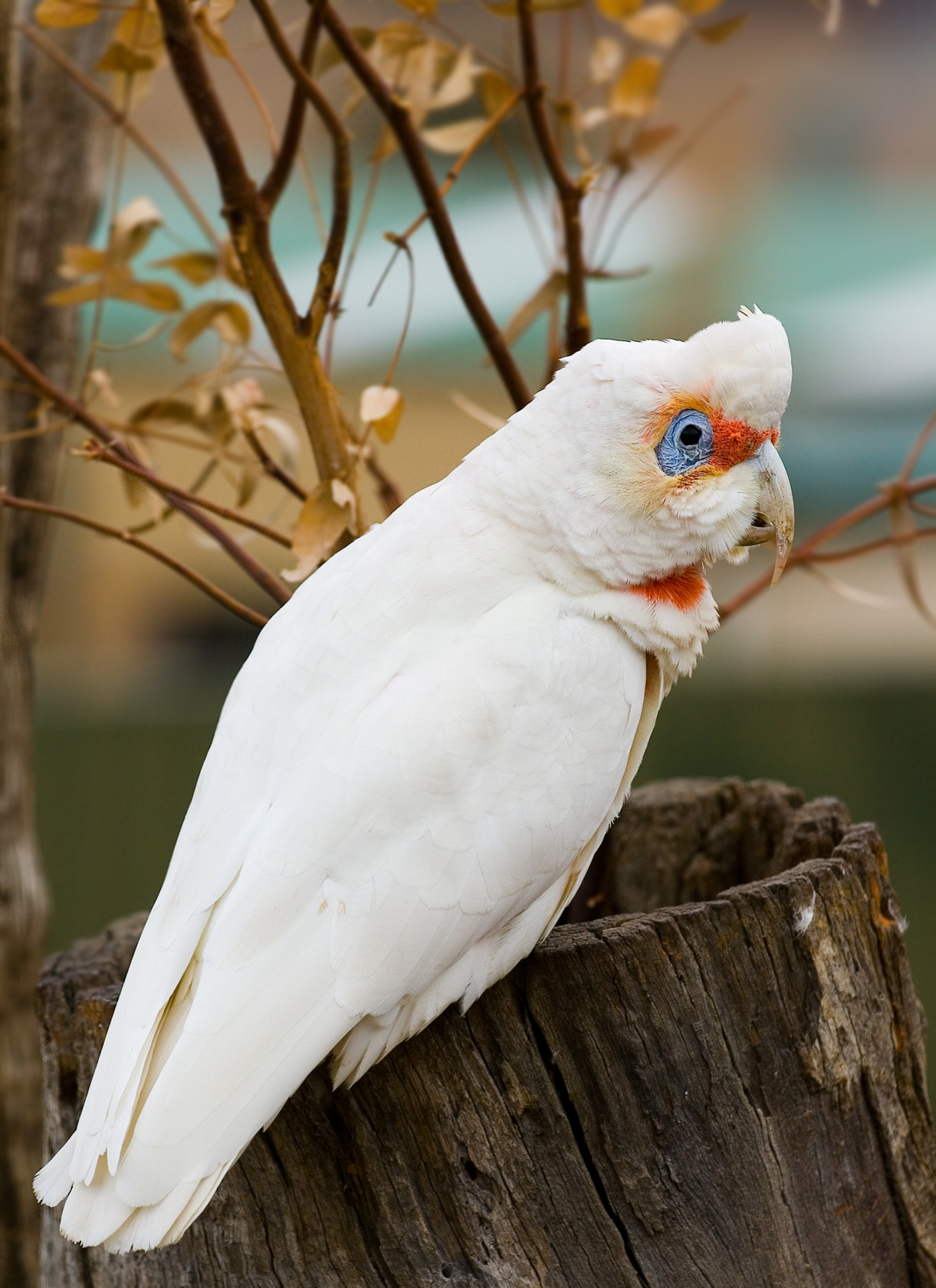

Conservation status
- Least Concern (IUCN 3.1)

Scientific classification
- Kingdom: Animalia
- Phylum: Chordata
- Class: Aves
- Order: Psittaciformes
- Family: Cacatuidae
- Genus: Cacatua
- Subgenus: Licmetis
- Species: C. tenuirostris

Binomial name
- Cacatua tenuirostris (Kuhl, 1820)
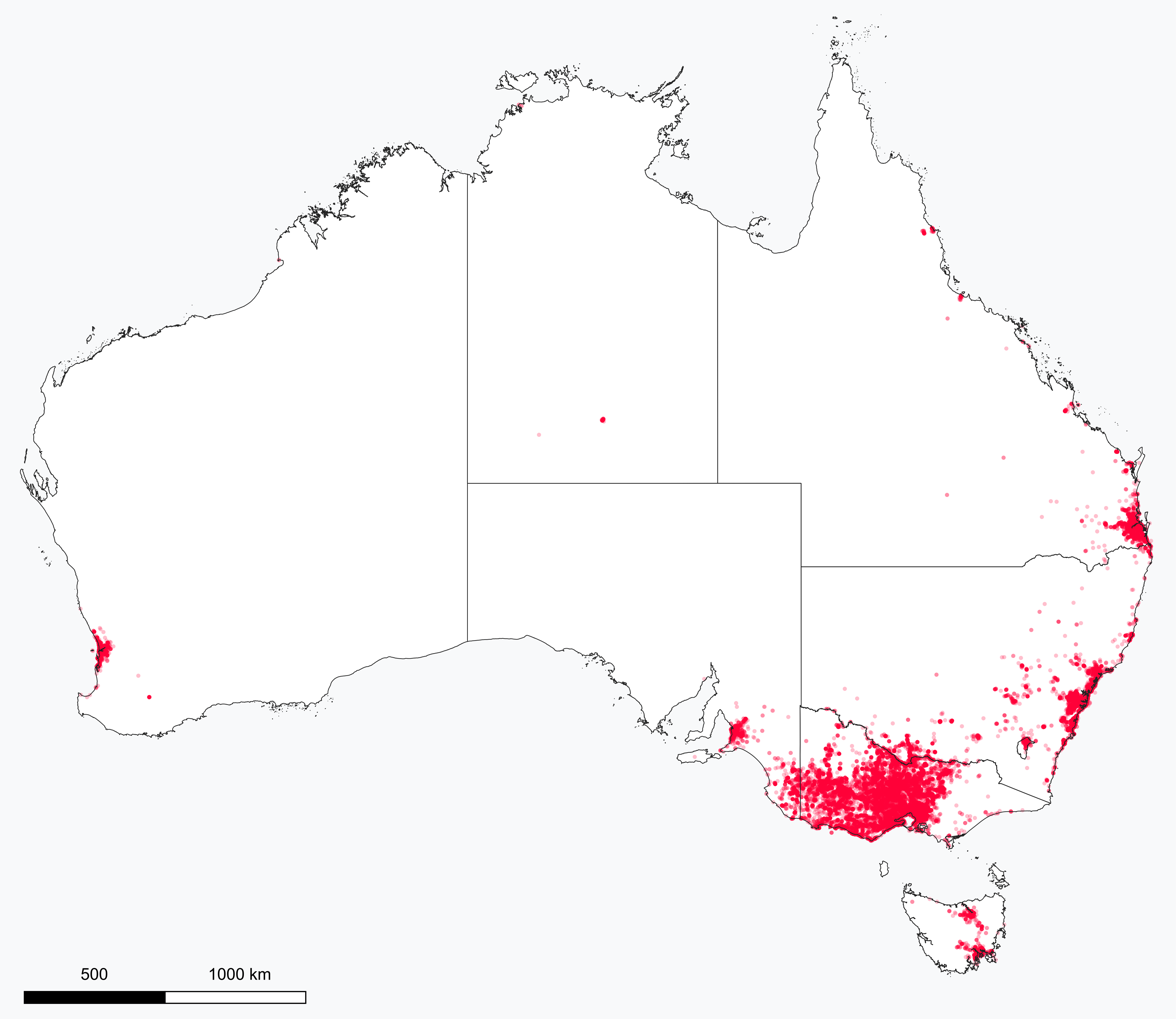
- Species distribution

= Long-billed corella =

Species of bird

The long-billed corella, also known as long-billed cockatoo or slender-billed corella (Cacatua tenuirostris), is a cockatoo native to Australia, which is similar in appearance to the little corella. This species is mostly white, with a reddish-pink face and forehead, and has a long, pale beak, which is used to dig for roots and seeds. It has reddish-pink feathers on the breast and belly.

== Taxonomy ==
The long-billed corella does not have any recognized subspecies. The first formal written description was by German naturalist Heinrich Kuhl in 1820. It is one of several related species of cockatoos called corellas and classified in the subgenus Licmetis within the genus Cacatua, members of which are known as "white cockatoos".

== Description ==
The adult long-billed corella measures from 38 to 41 cm in length, has a wingspan around 80–90 cm, and averages 567 g in weight. It has a long, bone-coloured beak, and a rim of featherless, bluish skin around the eyes. The plumage is predominantly white with reddish feathers around the eyes and lores. The underside of the wings and tail feathers are tinged with yellow.

== Distribution and habitat ==
The long-billed corella can be found in the wild in Victoria and southeastern New South Wales. It has extended its range since the 1970s into Melbourne, Victoria and can now be found in Tasmania, South Australia and southeast Queensland. A feral population resides in Perth, Western Australia as of the mid-1980s, which has conservation implications as this species may hybridize with the endangered western corella.

The long-billed corella is found in grassy woodlands and grasslands, including pasture, fields of agricultural crop, and urban parks. It can also be found in red gum woodland.

== Ecology and behaviour ==
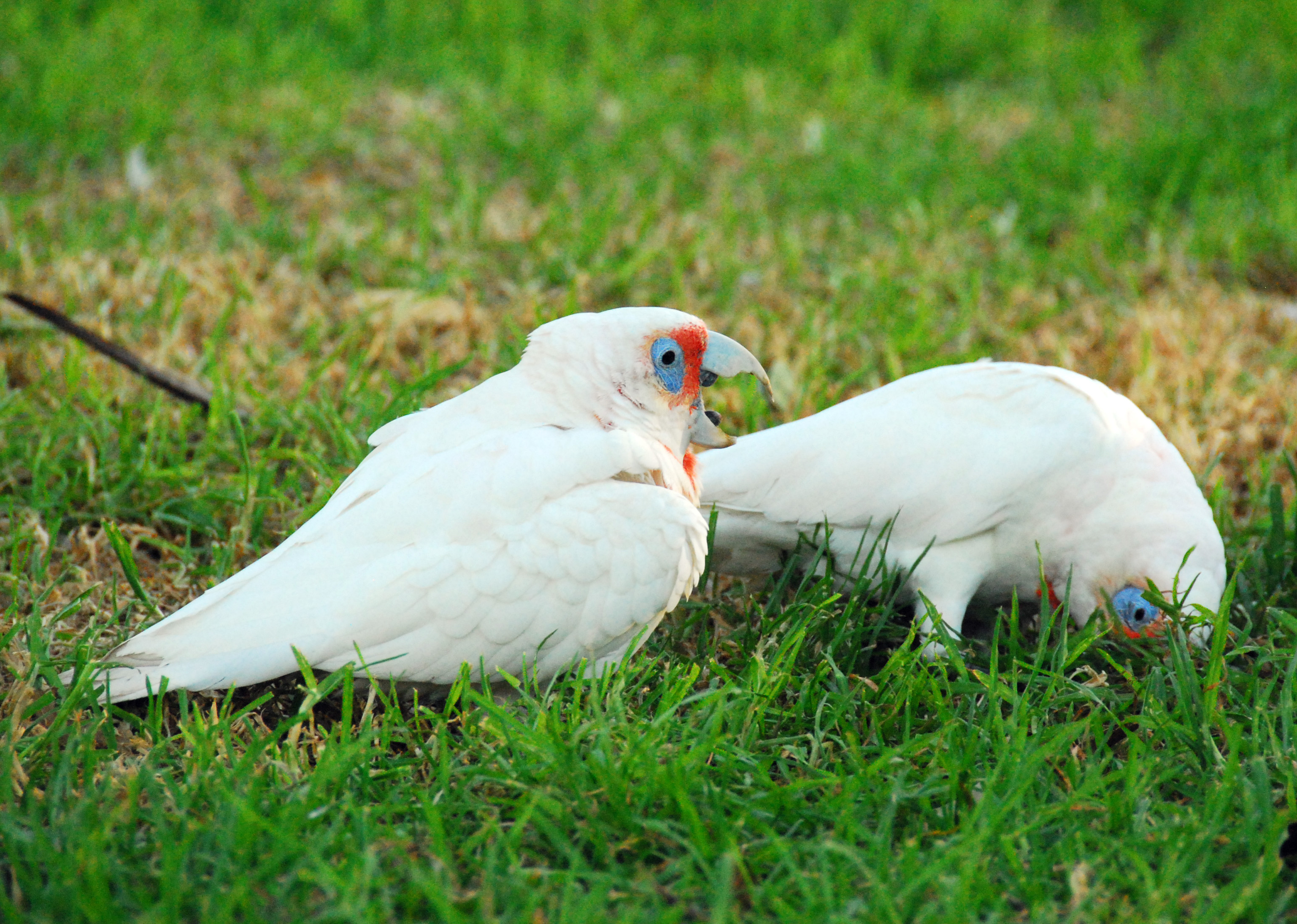
Feral parrots in Perth: The bird on the right is using its long beak to dig for food in short grass.

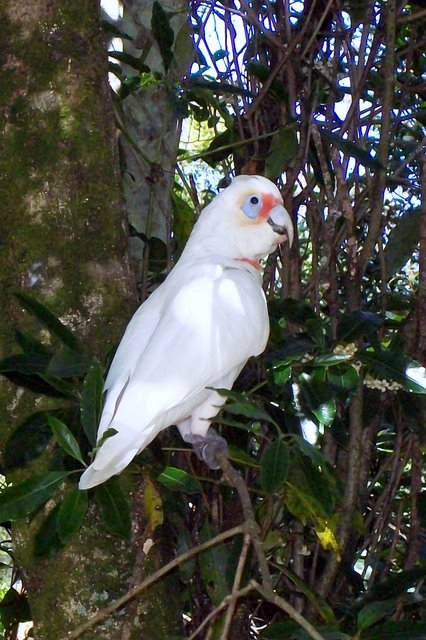
Wild bird in a coachwood/native daphne rainforest at Ourimbah, NSW

=== Call ===
The call of the long-billed corella is a quick, quavering, falsetto currup!, wulluk-wulluk, or cadillac-cadillac combined with harsh screeches.

=== Breeding ===
Breeding generally takes place in Austral winter to spring (from July to November). Long-billed corellas form monogamous pairs and both sexes share the task of building the nest, incubating the eggs, and caring for the young. Nests are made in decayed debris, the hollows of large old eucalypts, and occasionally in the cavities of loose gravely cliffs. 2–3 dull white, oval eggs are laid on a lining of decayed wood. The incubation period is around 24 days and chicks spend about 56 days in the nest.

=== Feeding ===
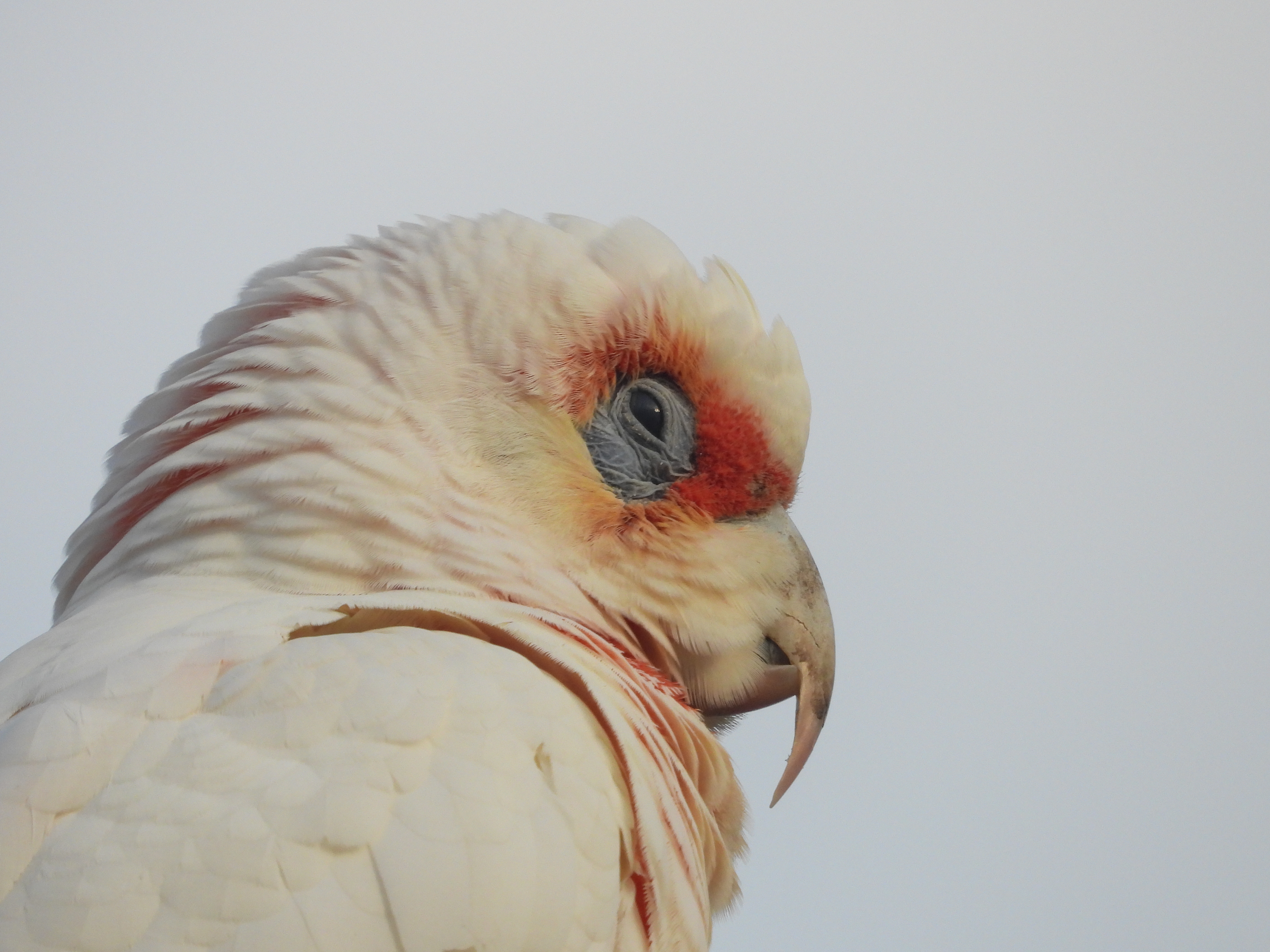
Long-billed corella in Melbourne

The long-billed corella typically digs for roots, seeds, corms, and bulbs, especially from the weed onion grass. Native plants eaten include murnong Microseris lanceolata, but a substantial portion of the bird's diet now includes introduced plants.

== Relationship with humans ==
=== As pets ===
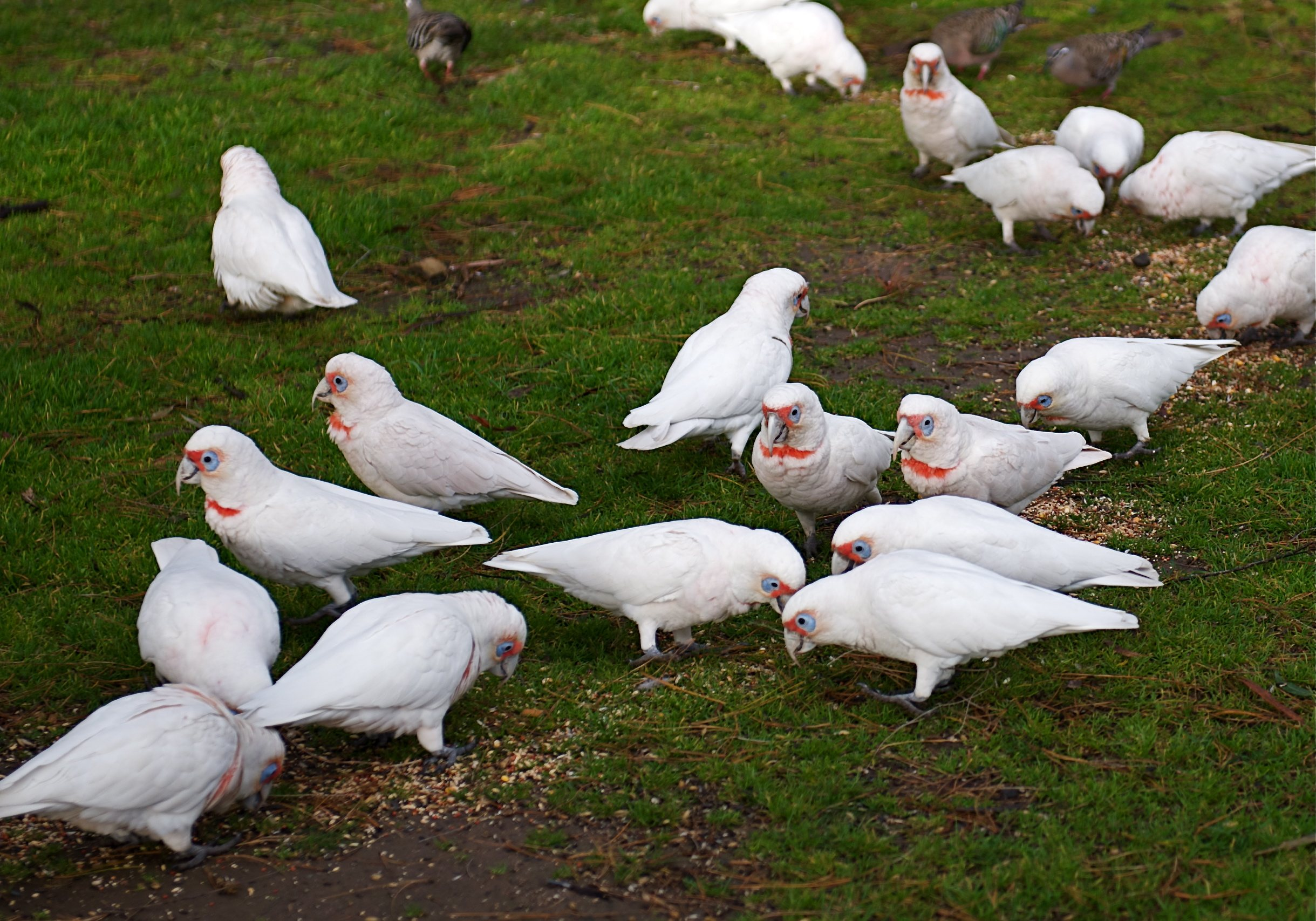
Many feeding in Melbourne, Australia

Long-billed corellas are now popular as pets in many parts of Australia, although they were formerly uncommon, and their captive population has stabilised in the last decade. This may be due to their ability to mimic words and whole sentences to near perfection. The long-billed corella has been labeled the best "talker" of the Australian cockatoos, and possibly of all native Psittacines.

=== As pests ===
Long-billed corellas are viewed as agricultural pests, particularly in western Victoria and Western Australia. They can cause significant crop damage, are known for tearing and playing with pieces of asphalt along roadsides, and even damaging power lines. Permits are regularly issued in Western Australia (and sometimes in Victoria) for the culling of this species. Within New South Wales, the corellas are the most common avian pest among sporting fields and golf courses, as they can dig holes in the ground up to 3 in across and 6 in deep.

In July 2019, in a scene that was said to resemble a "horror movie", about 60 corellas in Adelaide, South Australia, died in a suspected case of poisoning after "falling from the sky" wailing and bleeding from their mouths. At least 57 (95%) of the 60 birds were long-billed corellas, with a few short-billed corellas. It was hoped that whoever poisoned them could be traced, after toxicology tests were performed (which could nevertheless take several weeks to complete); in Australia, people are required to register if they purchase poisons, according to Sarah King (founder of Casper's Bird Rescue, who witnessed the deaths). King also said that the poison was a slow-release variety that takes several painful weeks to kill the bird. Additionally, the local Alexandrina council had, previously, allowed for periodic culling of short-billed corellas due to crop damage, chewing on streetlights and wires, damaging infrastructure (such as buildings and sporting equipment), and unfairly outcompeting other native species of birds, insects, small mammals, and other organisms.
