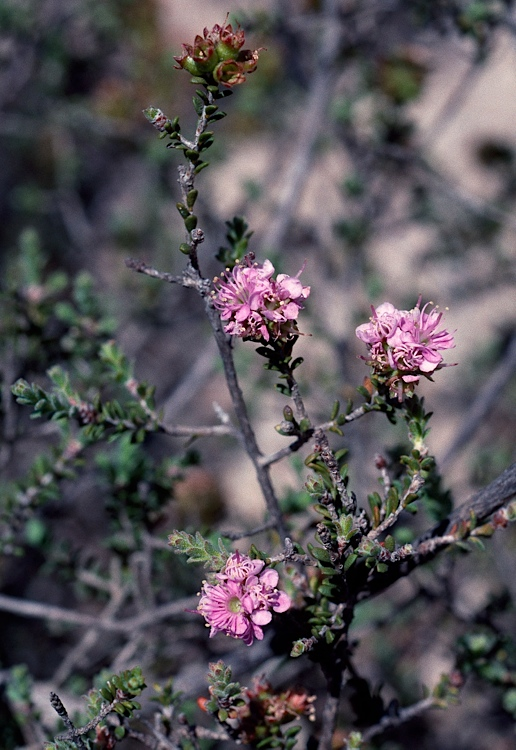
- Kunzea micormera in the Fitzgerald River National Park

Scientific classification
- Kingdom: Plantae
- Clade: Embryophytes
- Clade: Tracheophytes
- Clade: Spermatophytes
- Clade: Angiosperms
- Clade: Eudicots
- Clade: Rosids
- Order: Myrtales
- Family: Myrtaceae
- Genus: Kunzea
- Species: K. micromera

Binomial name
- Kunzea micromera Schauer

= Kunzea micromera =

Species of flowering plant

Kunzea micromera is a flowering plant in the myrtle family, Myrtaceae and is endemic to the south west of Western Australia. It is a small, sparse shrub, similar in some respects to K. micrantha but has shorter, more rounded sepal lobes. It produces groups of pink flowers on the ends of a few long shoots in spring.

== Description ==
Kunzea micromera is sparsely branched shrub which typically grows to a height of 20 to 60 centimetres (8 to 24 in), usually with a few main stems each with a few side branches. The leaves are elliptic to lance-shaped with the narrower end towards the base, mostly 1.5–3 mm (0.06–0.1 in) long and about 1 mm (0.04 in) wide with a petiole less than 0.5 mm (0.02 in) long. The flowers are arranged in heads of mostly twelve to twenty on the ends of a few long shoots. The flowers are surrounded by egg-shaped bracts which are 2–3 mm (0.08–0.1 in) long and 1.5–2.5 mm (0.06–0.1 in) wide and mostly glabrous and by pairs of slightly smaller bracteoles. The floral cup is about 3 mm (0.1 in) long and glabrous. The five sepals are egg-shaped with a rounded end, glabrous and about 1 mm (0.04 in) long. The five petals are pink, egg-shaped to almost round, 1.5–2 mm (0.06–0.08 in) long and wide. There are 14 to 22 stamens 2.5–3.5 mm (0.098–0.14 in) long in several rows in each flower. Flowering occurs between August and November and is followed by fruit which are urn-shaped capsules with an obvious bulge and with the sepals remaining.

== Taxonomy and naming ==
Kunzea micromera was first formally described in 1848 by the botanist Johannes Conrad Schauer in Johann Georg Christian Lehmann's work Plantae Preissianae. The specific epithet (micromera) is derived from the ancient Greek words mikros (μικρός) meaning "small" and meros (μέρος) meaning "part".

== Distribution and habitat ==
Often found in wet depressions and the margins of swamps between Stokes Inlet, Albany, Narrogin and Newdegate in the Avon Wheatbelt, Esperance Plains, Jarrah Forest, Mallee, Swan Coastal Plain and Warren biogeographic regions, K. micromera grows in sandy or clay soils.
