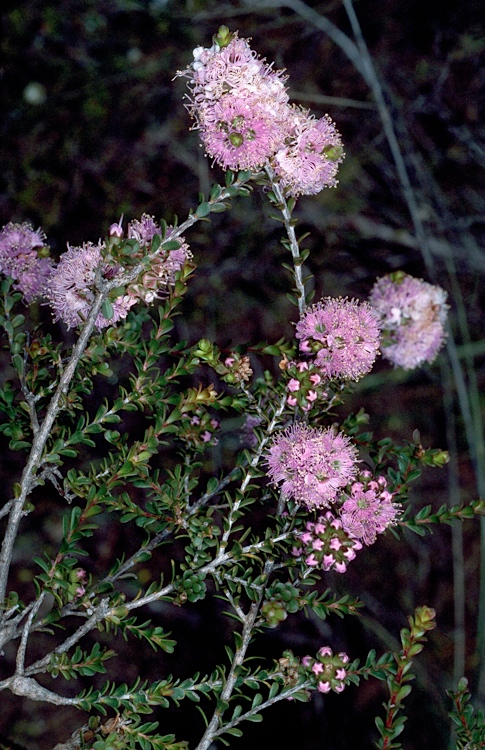
- Kunzea micrantha near Bullsbrook

Scientific classification
- Kingdom: Plantae
- Clade: Tracheophytes
- Clade: Angiosperms
- Clade: Eudicots
- Clade: Rosids
- Order: Myrtales
- Family: Myrtaceae
- Genus: Kunzea
- Species: K. micrantha

Binomial name
- Kunzea micrantha Schauer

= Kunzea micrantha =

Species of flowering plant

Kunzea micrantha is a flowering plant in the myrtle family, Myrtaceae and is endemic to the south west of Western Australia. It blooms between September and December producing pink-purple to white-cream flowers. A widespread and variable species, it is difficult to distinguish from K. praestans and from K. micromera where their range overlap.

== Description ==
Kunzea micrantha is an erect shrub which typically grows to a height of 0.3 to 1.5 metres (1 to 5 ft), usually with many mains stems with a moderate number of thin, wiry side branches. The leaves are linear to lance-shaped with the narrower end towards the base, about 1–7 mm (0.04–0.3 in) long and 0.5–2 mm (0.02–0.08 in) wide with a petiole less than 1 mm (0.04 in) long. The flowers are arranged in heads of mostly twenty to forty on the ends of long stems. The flowers are surrounded by bracts which are 1.5–3 mm (0.06–0.1 in) long and about 1 mm (0.04 in) wide, mostly glabrous except for a few hairs around the edges and by pairs of smaller bracteoles. The floral cup is 2–3 mm (0.08–0.1 in) long and the five sepals are lance-shaped to triangular, glabrous and about 1 mm (0.04 in) long. The five petals are pink-purple to white-cream, lance-shaped to spatula-shaped with the narrower end towards the base and 1.5–2 mm (0.06–0.08 in) long and wide. There are 12 to 40 stamens 2.5–3.5 mm (0.098–0.14 in) long in several rows in each flower. Flowering occurs mainly between September and December and is followed by fruit which are urn-shaped capsules with the sepals remaining. This kunzea is similar to K. affinis but is distinguished mainly by the mostly glabrous leaves and bracts.

It is similar to Kunzea micromera and K. praestans, sometimes forming hybrids with those species and is difficult to distinguish from them where the ranges overlap.

== Taxonomy and naming ==
Kunzea micrantha was first formally described in 1844 by the botanist Johannes Conrad Schauer in Johann Georg Christian Lehmann's work Plantae Preissianae.

In 1996, Hellmut R. Toelken described 4 subspecies of Kunzea micrantha and the names are accepted by the Australian Plant Census:

- Kunzea micrantha subsp. micrantha which grows in a few swamps on the Swan Coastal Plain from near Perth to near Busselton with scattered populations near Augusta;
- Kunzea micrantha subsp. petiolata which grows in temporary swamps on the coastal plain from near the Swan River to near Jurien Bay;
- Kunzea micrantha subsp. oligandra which is mostly found inland from near Manjimup to Porongorup and also near Bremer Bay, growing in temporary marshes;
- Kunzea micrantha subsp. hirtiflora which is only known from two locations near Lake Muir where it grows in temporary marshes.

The specific epithet (micrantha) is derived from the Ancient Greek words mikros meaning "small" and anthos meaning "flower".

== Distribution and habitat ==
Often found in wet depressions and marshes in coastal areas in the Avon Wheatbelt, Esperance Plains, Jarrah Forest, Mallee, Swan Coastal Plain and Warren biogeographic regions, Kunzea micrantha grows in sandy, clay and loamy soils.

== Conservation ==
Kunzea micrantha is classified as "not threatened" by the Western Australian Government Department of Parks and Wildlife but subspecies hirtiflora is listed as "Priority Three" by the Government of Western Australia Department of Parks and Wildlife meaning that it is poorly known and known from only a few locations but is not under imminent threat.
