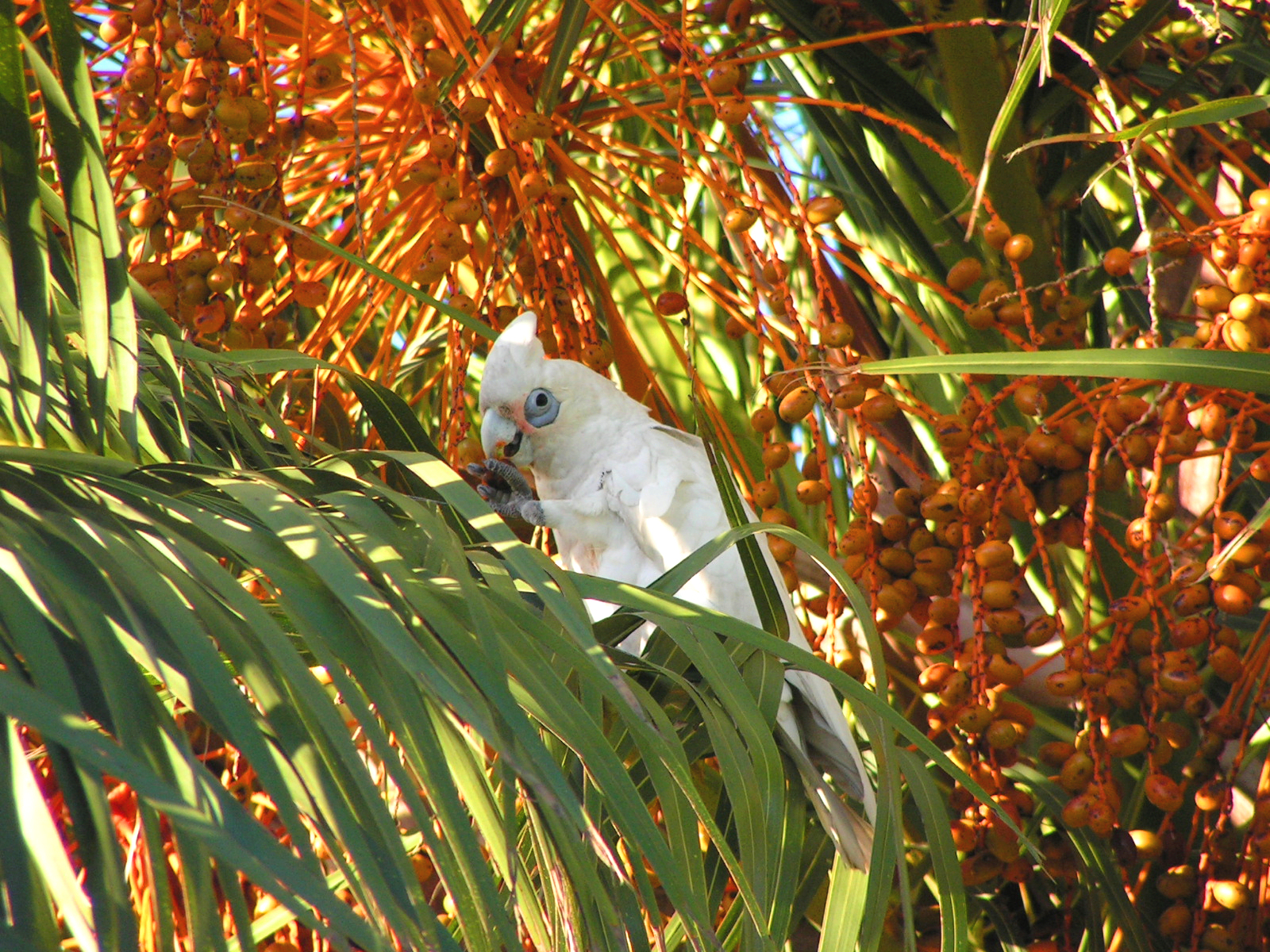

Scientific classification
- Kingdom: Animalia
- Phylum: Chordata
- Class: Aves
- Order: Psittaciformes
- Family: Cacatuidae
- Genus: Cacatua
- Species: C. pastinator
- Subspecies: C. p. pastinator

Trinomial name
- Cacatua pastinator pastinator (Gould, 1841)

= Muir's corella =

Subspecies of bird

Muir's corella (Cacatua pastinator pastinator) is a stocky, medium-sized white cockatoo endemic to Western Australia. It was the threatened nominate subspecies of the western corella. It was removed from the WA's threatened species list in November 2012 as a result of successful conservation efforts.

== Description ==
Muir's corella has mainly white plumage with an erectile white crest. The undersides of the wings and tail are yellow. The feathers between the eye and beak are deep salmon-pink, as are the bases of the feathers on the head and underparts. The eye is surrounded by a broad grey-blue eye-ring. The white feathers are often stained with soil because of the birds’ foraging activities. The corellas have a wingspan of 90 cm (35 in), and range from 43–48 cm (17–19 in) in length and 560–815 g (19.8–28.7 oz) in weight. They have a variety of loud and raucous calls. They are very similar in appearance to Butler's corella, the only other subspecies of the western corella, being slightly larger with a longer upper mandible.

== Distribution and habitat ==
Muir's corella formerly inhabited woodlands and open country east of the main area of forest in south-western Western Australia, occurring north to the Swan and Avon Rivers, south to Albany and Augusta, and eastwards to the Stirling and Porongurup Ranges. The birds were distributed in small, widely separated colonies throughout this range. However, the population has declined and the subspecies now only occurs in the Lake Muir region where the remainder of the woodland habitat consists of fragmented remnants.

== Behaviour ==
Muir's corellas are gregarious and may be seen in flocks of ten to a thousand birds. They have traditional roosting sites, usually in dense timber, which they leave in the morning for their feeding areas and return to at night.

=== Feeding ===
The corellas forage on the ground in large flocks and feed on a wide variety of seeds of both native and introduced plants, as well as corms and tubers which they dig up using the elongated upper mandibles of their bills. Cereal grains, including oats, barley and wheat, are eaten extensively in summer and autumn, while the corms of onion grass are important in winter and spring.

=== Breeding ===
The corellas nest in tree hollows of large, mature eucalypts, including jarrah and marri. Eggs are laid from September to November with a clutch size of 1–3. The incubation period lasts 26–29 days until fledging.

During the breeding season the birds feed close to the nest tree. After fledging, the young birds and their parents join other family groups to form large flocks that disperse to summer feeding areas. At the end of summer, breeding adults return to their nest sites while immature birds form nomadic flocks.

== Status and conservation ==
Muir's corella is considered to be threatened because it consists of one relatively small and isolated population covering a fragmented range of about 3,000 km^{2} (1,200 sq mi), with the actual area of occupancy being about 500 km^{2}. It is listed as Vulnerable under Australia's Environment Protection and Biodiversity Conservation Act 1999. Population estimates vary; it may comprise up to 9,000 individuals, including only about 2,500 mature birds, having gradually recovered from a low of about 100 individuals in the 1940s after widespread shooting and poisoning in the late nineteenth and early twentieth centuries. Average life expectancy of adults has been estimated at 17 years for males and 14 years for females, with most young birds dying before they reach breeding age of 3–5 years old.

While current nest hollow and food availability are sufficient to sustain the population, changes in land use may threaten the corella where remnant vegetation and paddock trees are cleared to establish plantations of blue gum and other species. It is potentially threatened by competition from, and interbreeding with, a species introduced from south-eastern Australia, the closely related long-billed corella, which has nearby populations established from avicultural escapes and releases. Other threats include illegal shooting and poisoning, as well as competition for nest hollows with feral honey bees.

Because the corellas sometimes cause damage to crops, young trees, gardens, power lines and house fittings, the subspecies is a declared pest of agriculture. However, because it is listed as ‘rare or likely to become extinct’, it is illegal to destroy them, and damage mitigation measures must use non-lethal means.
