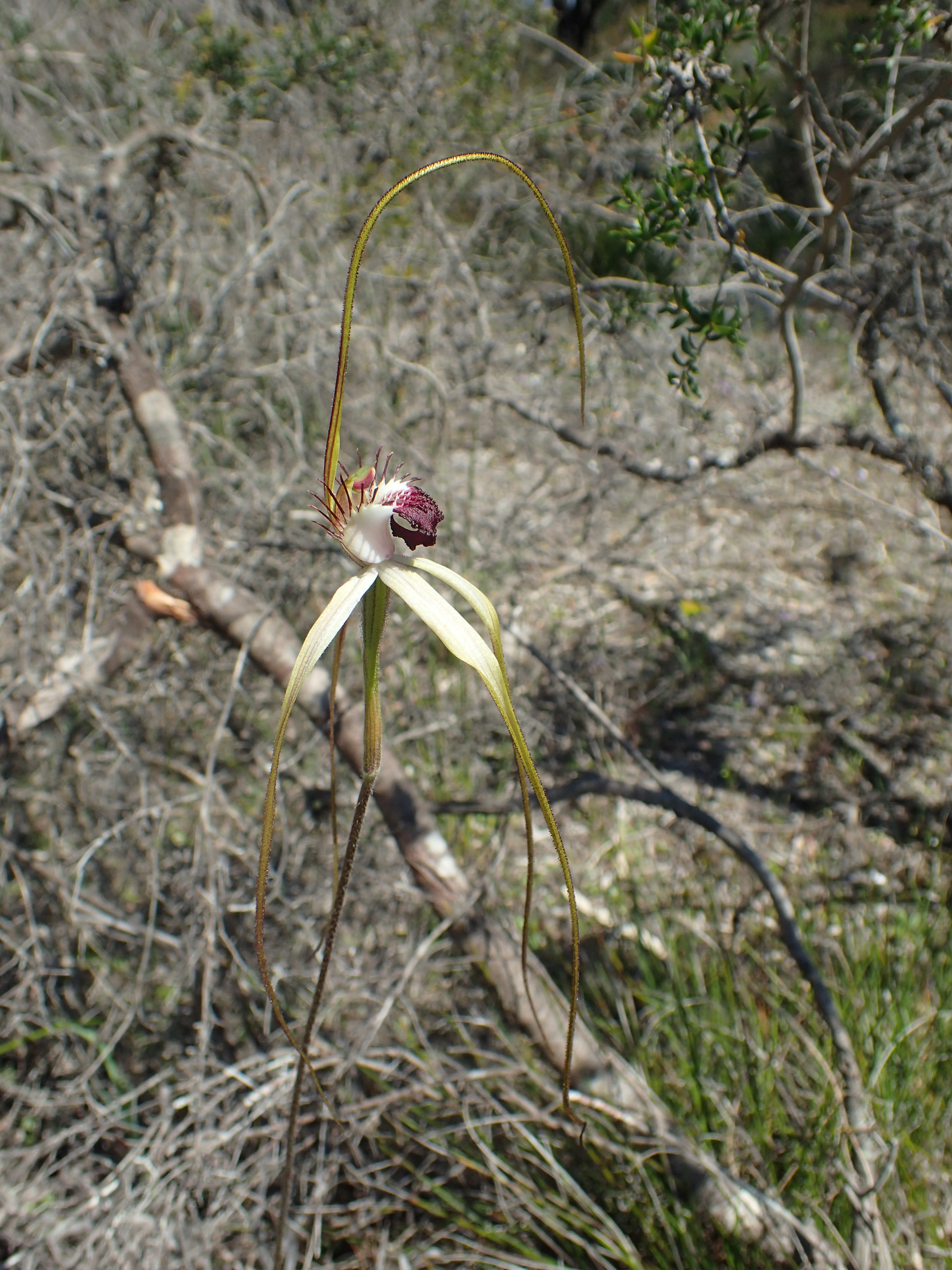
- Near Yallingup

Conservation status
- Endangered (EPBC Act)

Scientific classification
- Kingdom: Plantae
- Clade: Embryophytes
- Clade: Tracheophytes
- Clade: Spermatophytes
- Clade: Angiosperms
- Clade: Monocots
- Order: Asparagales
- Family: Orchidaceae
- Subfamily: Orchidoideae
- Tribe: Diurideae
- Genus: Caladenia
- Species: C. excelsa

Binomial name
- Caladenia excelsa Hopper & A.P.Br. 2001

Synonyms
- List: Arachnorchis excelsa (Hopper & A.P.Br.) D.L.Jones & M.A.Clem.; Caladenia excelsa N.Hoffman & A.P.Br. nom. inval.; Caladenia excelsa N.Hoffman & A.P.Br. nom. inval.; Caladenia excelsa Anon. nom. inval., nom. nud.; Caladenia excelsa Paczk. & A.R.Chapm. nom. inval.; Caladenia sp. (Leeuwin-Naturaliste) S.D.Hopper 4670; Caladenia sp. 8 (Leeuwin-Naturaliste); Calonemorchis excelsa (Hopper & A.P.Br.) Szlach. & Rutk.

= Caladenia excelsa =

Giant spider orchid

Species of orchid

Caladenia excelsa, commonly known as giant spider orchid, is a species of orchid endemic to a small area in the south-west of Western Australia. It is a rare species with a single, hairy leaf and up to three cream-coloured to greenish-cream flowers with long, drooping sepals and petals. It is one of the tallest spider orchids in Western Australia and, with Caladenia splendens, has the largest flowers of any Western Australian orchid.

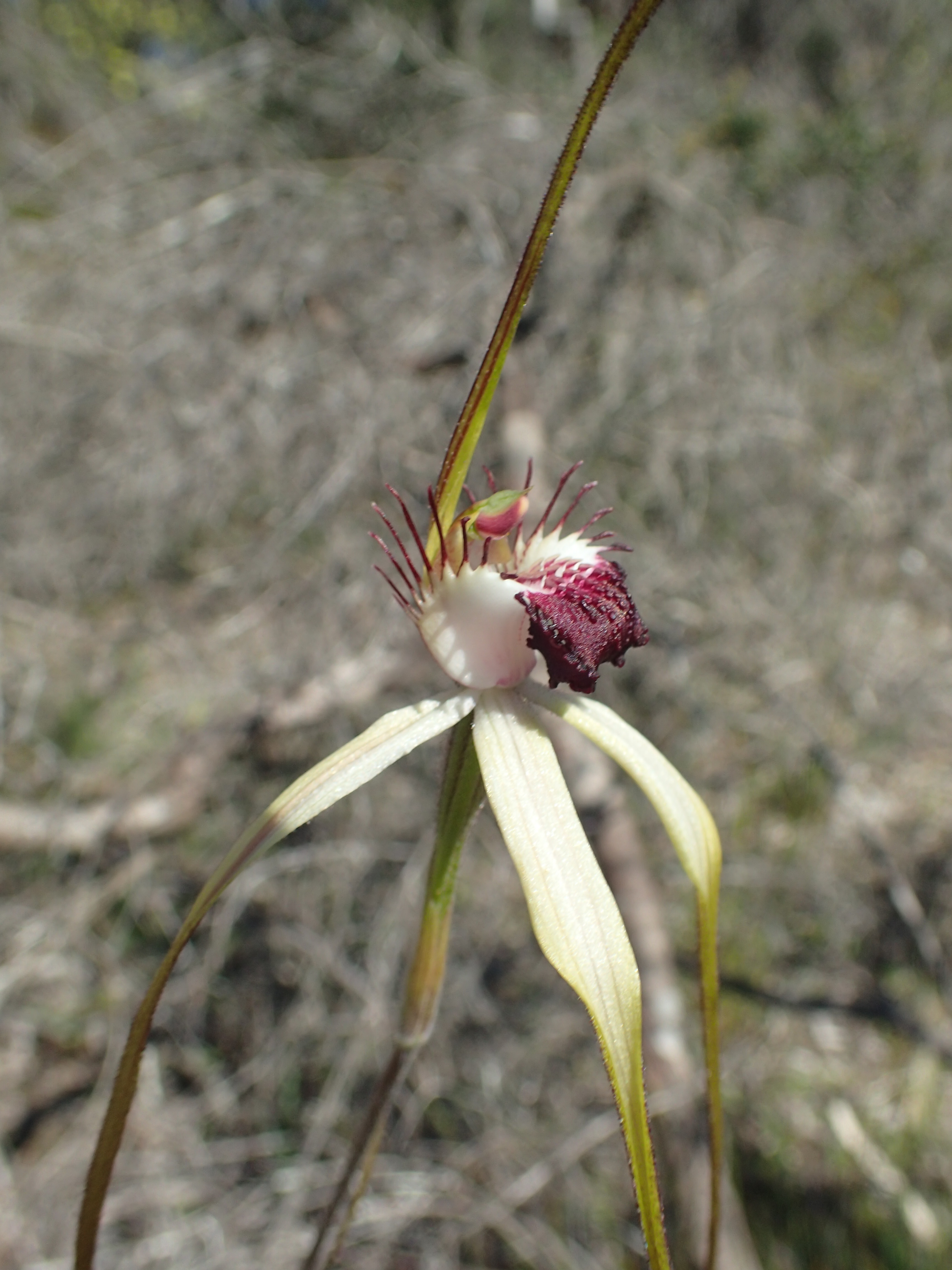
Labellum detail

== Description ==
Caladenia excelsa is a terrestrial, perennial, deciduous, herb with an underground tuber and a single erect, hairy leaf, 200–350 mm (8–10 in) long and 6–12 mm (0.2–0.5 in) wide. One or two cream-coloured to greenish-cream flowers 150–300 mm (6–10 in) long and 70–150 mm (3–6 in) wide are borne on a stalk 450–900 mm (20–40 in) tall. The sepals and petals have long, brownish, drooping thread-like tips. The dorsal sepal curves backwards behind the flower, 130–200 mm (5–8 in) long and 3–5 mm (0.1–0.2 in) wide at the base. The lateral sepals are 130–200 mm (5–8 in) long and 5–7 mm (0.2–0.3 in) wide at the base and taper to long, thin tips. The petals are 95–150 mm (4–6 in) long, 3–5 mm (0.1–0.2 in) wide at their bases and taper like the lateral sepals. The labellum is creamy-coloured with a red tip, 25–35 mm (0.98–1.4 in) long, 12–17 mm (0.5–0.7 in) wide and has many thin teeth up to 10 mm (0.4 in) long on its sides. There are four rows of maroon or white calli along the centre line of the labellum. Flowering occurs from late September to early November.

== Taxonomy and naming ==
Caladenia excelsa was first described by Stephen Hopper and Andrew Brown in 2001 from a specimen collected by Hopper near Margaret River. The description was published in Nuytsia. The specific epithet (excelsa) is a Latin word meaning "high" or "lofty" referring to the tallness of the flower spike.

== Distribution and habitat ==
The giant spider orchid is found between Dunsborough and Karridale in the Jarrah Forest and Warren biogeographic regions where it grows in forests in deep sandy soils.

== Conservation ==
Caladenia excelsa is classified as "Threatened Flora (Declared Rare Flora — Extant)" by the Western Australian Government Department of Parks and Wildlife and it has also been listed as "Endangered" (EN) under the Australian Government Environment Protection and Biodiversity Conservation Act 1999 (EPBC Act). The main threats to the species are weed invasion, grazing (especially by the Western grey kangaroo), prescribed burning and infrastructure maintenance.
