= Brachyscias =

Conservation status
- Critically endangered (EPBC Act)

Scientific classification
- Kingdom: Plantae
- Clade: Tracheophytes
- Clade: Angiosperms
- Clade: Eudicots
- Clade: Asterids
- Order: Apiales
- Family: Apiaceae
- Genus: Brachyscias; J.M.Hart & Henwood
- Species: B. verecundus

Binomial name
- Brachyscias verecundus J.M.Hart & Henwood

Genus of flowering plants

Brachyscias is a monotypic genus of flowering plants in the family Apiaceae. Its only species is Brachyscias verecundus (common name - ironstone brachyscias), described in 1999, from Southwest Australia.

== Conservation status ==
It is listed as critically endangered under the Australian government's Environment Protection and Biodiversity Conservation Act 1999, due to there being just one confirmed population and extreme fluctuations in the number of mature individuals, together with a continuing decline in the habitat quality. Threats include "firebreak maintenance activities, lack of appropriate disturbance, inappropriate fire regimes, mineral exploration, hydrological changes, weed invasion and rabbits".
