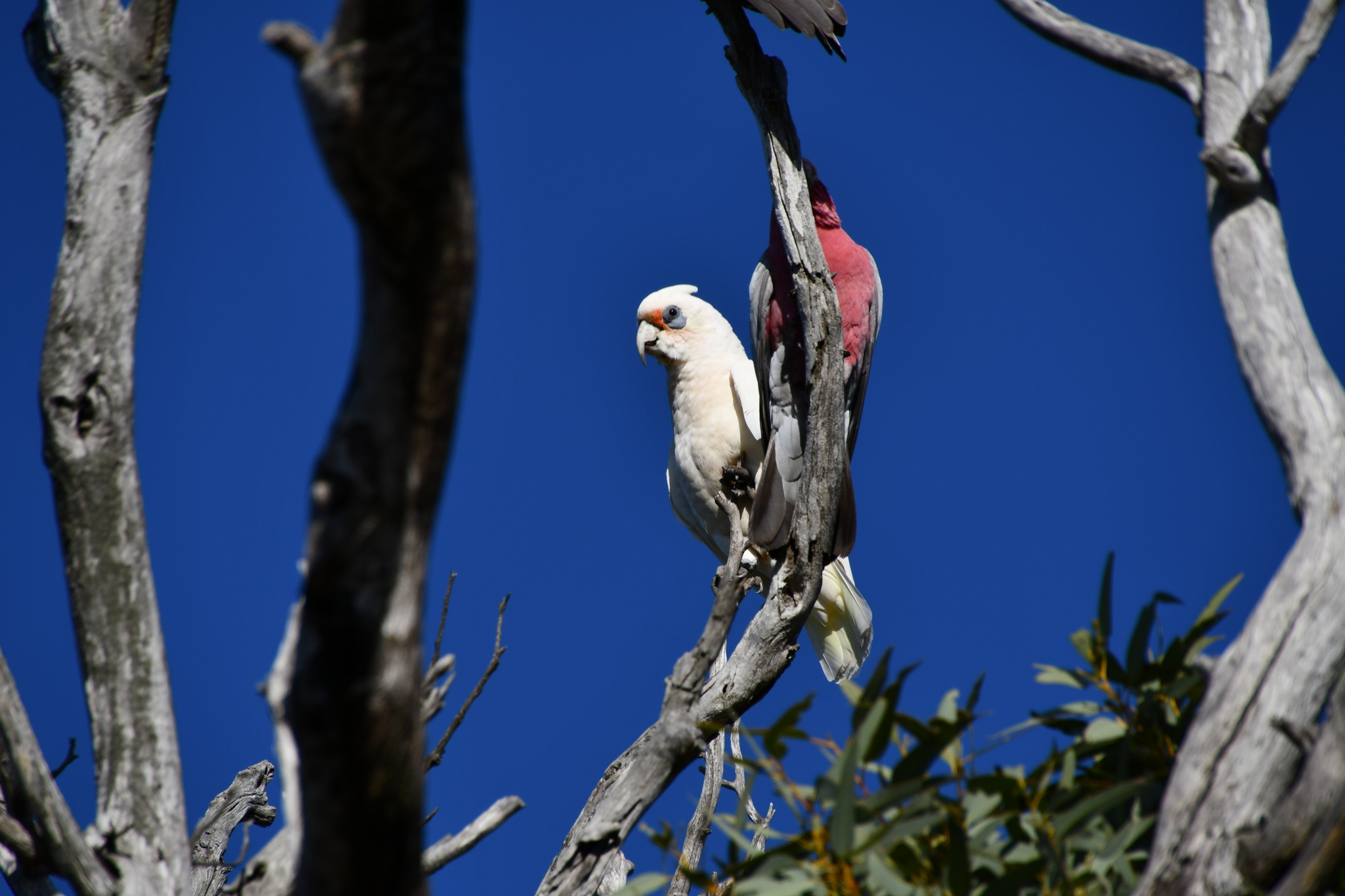

Scientific classification
- Kingdom: Animalia
- Phylum: Chordata
- Class: Aves
- Order: Psittaciformes
- Family: Cacatuidae
- Genus: Cacatua
- Species: C. pastinator
- Subspecies: C. p. butleri

Trinomial name
- Cacatua pastinator butleri Ford, J., 1987

= Butler's corella =

Subspecies of bird

Butler's corella (Cacatua pastinator butleri) is a medium-sized white cockatoo endemic to Western Australia. It is one of two subspecies of the western corella.

== Description ==
Butler's corella has mainly white plumage with a distinct white crest. The undersides of the wings and tail are pale yellow. The feathers between the eye and beak are deep salmon-pink, as are the bases of the feathers on the head and underparts. The eye is surrounded by a broad grey-blue eye-ring. The white plumage is often stained with soil because of the birds’ foraging activities. The corellas range from 40 to 48 cm in length and 600–750 g in weight. They are very similar in appearance to Muir's corella, the nominate subspecies of the western corella.

== Distribution and habitat ==
Butler's corella is found in the northern and central wheatbelt of south-west Western Australia. Its habitat is open woodland and farmland where there are nearby trees for roosting in. It has benefited from agricultural development with access to food from cereal crops and permanent water.

== Behaviour ==
Butler's corella is gregarious and may be seen in large flocks of up to several thousand birds.

=== Feeding ===
The corellas feed extensively on the seeds of cereal crops, the seeds of weeds such as Cape weed (Arctotheca calendula) and double gee (Emex australis), as well as the corms of onion grass (Romulea rosea) and insect larvae.

=== Breeding ===
The corellas nest in tree hollows of large, mature eucalypts, including wandoo (Eucalyptus wandoo) and salmon gum (Eucalyptus salmonophloia). Eggs are laid from August to October with a clutch size of 1-4 (averaging 2.7). The incubation period lasts 24–29 days, following which the chicks remain in the hollow for about 60 days until fledging.

After fledging, the young birds begin to forage for themselves in 2–3 weeks but continue to be dependent on their parents for another 6 months, moving with them in family groups to feeding areas and roosts. They do not start breeding until they are 3–5 years old.

== Status and conservation ==
Butler's corella is not considered to be threatened. The population comprises some 20–30,000 birds and is gradually spreading in the south-east of its range. Average life expectancy of adults has been estimated at 17 years for males and 14 years for females. However, most young birds die before they reach breeding age.

Because flocks sometimes cause damage by defoliating trees, by digging up lawns, sports grounds and race tracks, by chewing wiring and house fittings, and by being very noisy, the subspecies is a declared pest of agriculture. Birds may be destroyed where they are considered a nuisance.
