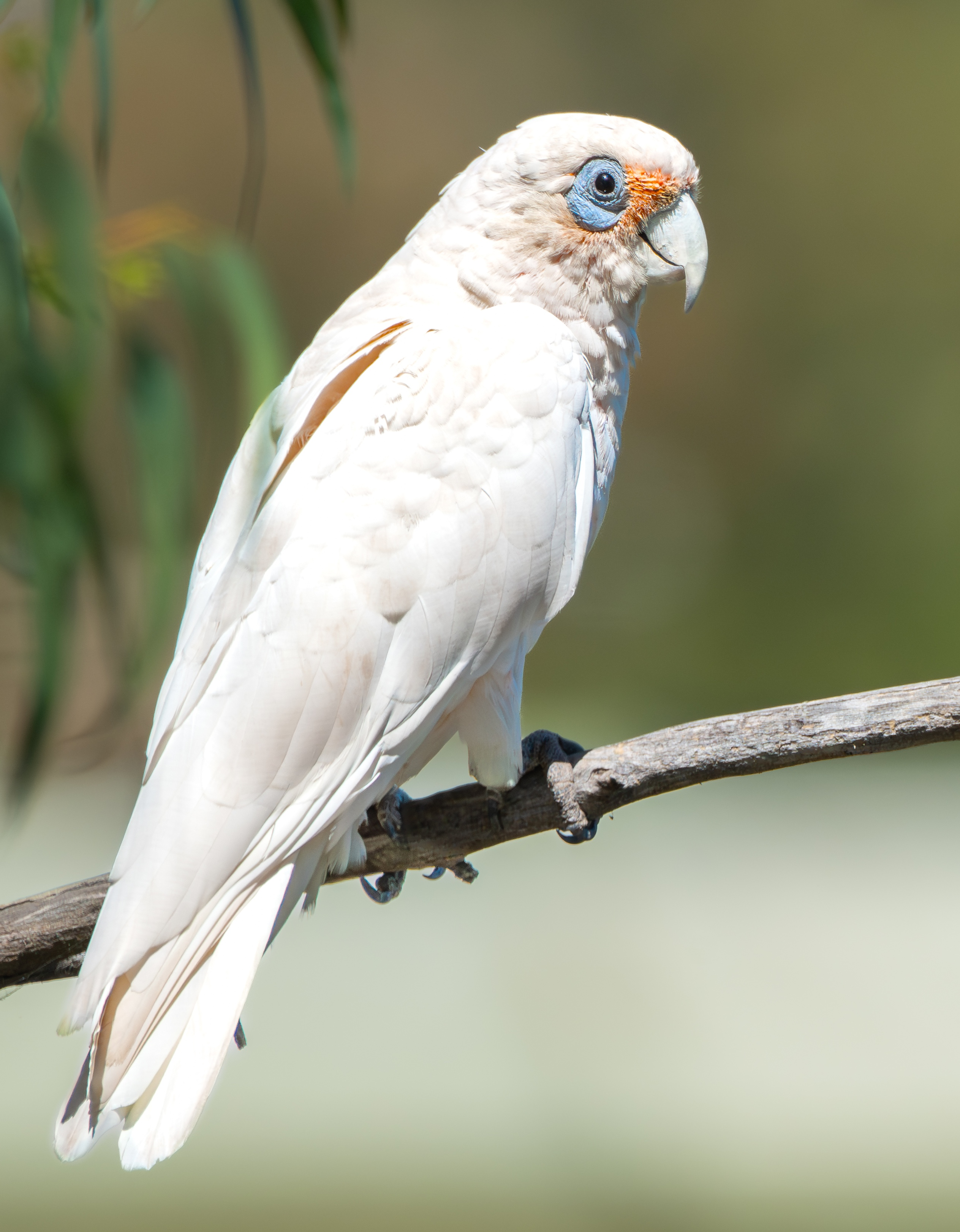
- Western corella at Avon River, near Northam, WA.

Conservation status
- Least Concern (IUCN 3.1)

Scientific classification
- Kingdom: Animalia
- Phylum: Chordata
- Class: Aves
- Order: Psittaciformes
- Family: Cacatuidae
- Genus: Cacatua
- Subgenus: Licmetis
- Species: C. pastinator

Binomial name
- Cacatua pastinator (Gould, 1841)

Subspecies
- Cacatua pastinator butleri; Cacatua pastinator pastinator

= Western corella =

Species of bird

The western corella (Cacatua pastinator) also known as the western long-billed corella, is a species of white cockatoo endemic to south-western Australia.

== Taxonomy ==
Cacatuidae is one of three families of the large and diverse avian order Psittaciformes which consists of 370 species. Cockatoos are distinguished from other parrots by five main morphological features – a crest, lack of "green" dyck-texture in the plumage, yellow natal down, a gall bladder, and bridge temporal fossa

The western corella (also known as the western long-billed corella) Cacatua pastinator consists of two geographically isolated sub-species, Butler's corella (Cacatua pastinator butleri) and Muir's corella (Cacatua pastinator pastinator)

One of these two isolated populations occurs in the northern wheat-belt region of Southwest Australia, the other, consisting of larger birds occurs in the far south west of Western Australia. The northern Cacatua pastinator butleri consists of generally of smaller birds than the southern Cacatua pastinator pastinator, which indicates that the two populations may have once been connected clinally.

The Australian Faunal Directory, citing a classification by Johann Georg Wagler of genus Licmetis, recognises this species within a subgeneric arrangement as Cacatua (Licmetis) pastinator as determined in a revision published in 1987. Two subspecies are recognised, the nominate Cacatua (Licmetis) pastinator pastinator and Cacatua (Licmetis) pastinator derbyi Mathews, 1916. This was published by Gregory Mathews to describe a specimen that was obtained in the northern Wheatbelt region, the labelling recognised as by the collector J. T. Tunney, which was later annotated as "Derby" and presumed by Mathews to refer to Derby, Western Australia. The subspecies name, despite the apparent mislocation, was recognised by Richard Schodde in the Zoological Catalogue of Australia, 1997.

The common names include western corella and western long-billed corella. The names in the Noongar language were surveyed and regularised as manatj and manyte for adoption into common usage. Manatj is used to refer to the Western Australian Police, presumed to be an association with the species "noisy and inquisitive" nature.

== Description ==
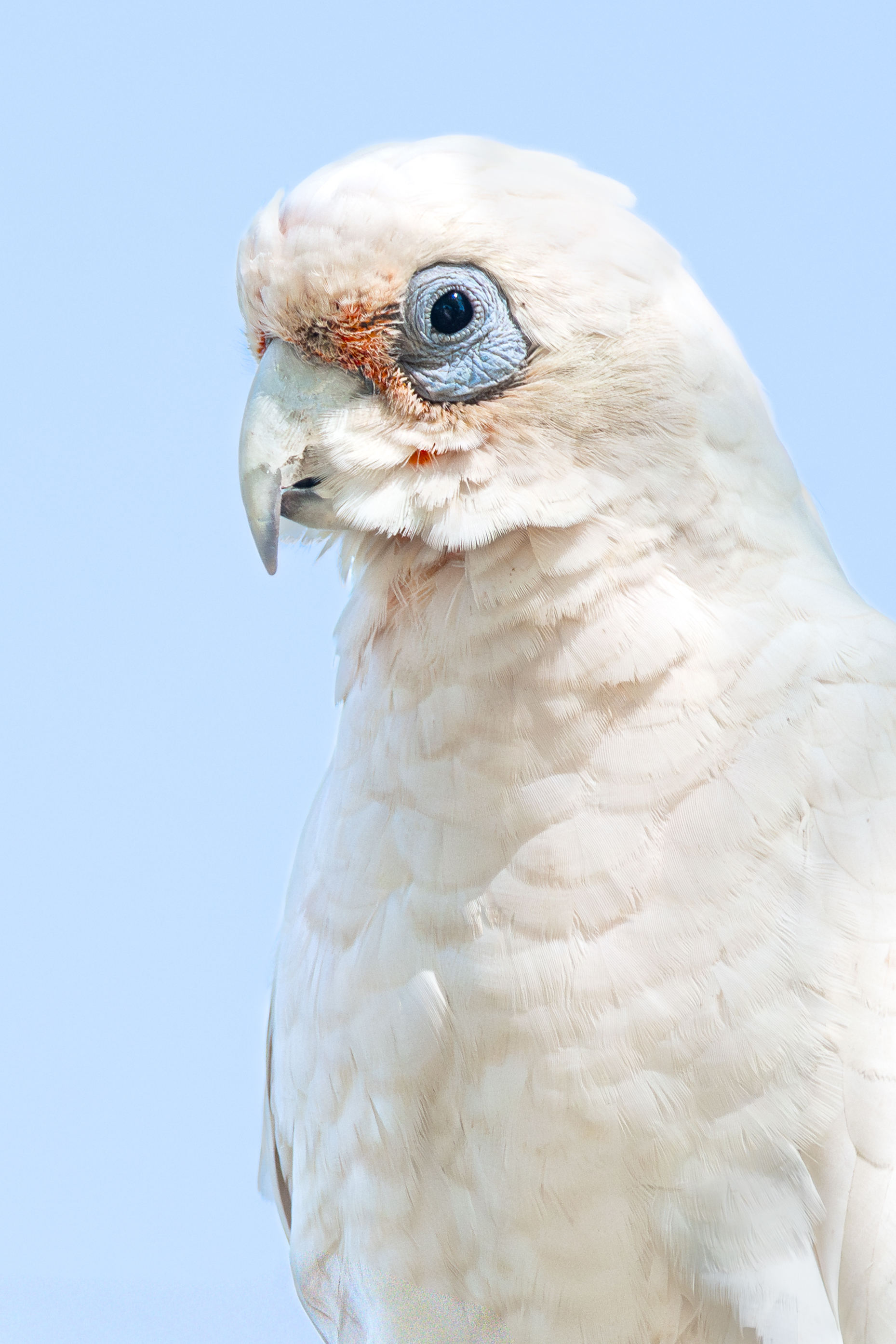
Portrait of Cacatua pastinator butleri in Northam, Western Australia, Western Australia

Cacatua pastinator is a white cockatoo with the upper wing entirely white and under surface of the wing pale yellow. It has an erect white crest, blue grey eye skin, crimson pink colouring between the eyes and beak, a small pink patch on the throat, and long pointed bill. Cacatua pastinator lacks sexual dimorphism and the sexes are difficult to distinguish. Determination of the sex of Cacatua pastinator cannot be determined on the basis of eye colour or plumage, observations of pairs have revealed that the males are larger than the females and have a deeper alarm call. Cacatua pastinator is a medium-sized stocky cockatoo with broad rounded wings, a short tail, and a crest which is usually flattened. Muir's Corella (Cacatua pastinator pastinator) adults range in length from 43–48 centimetres (17–19 in) and weigh 560–815 grams (19.8–28.7 oz). The northern subspecies, Butler's Corella (Cacatua pastinator butleri), are a smaller bird with adults 40–48 centimetres (16–19 in) in length and weighing up to 700 grams (25 oz). The bill is a dullish grey white, the legs are dark grey and the upper mandible has a long tip. The underparts are often stained or dirty as a result of feeding on the ground and digging.

The flesh of the western corella is described as plump and tender, and suitable for stewing.

== Distribution and habitat ==
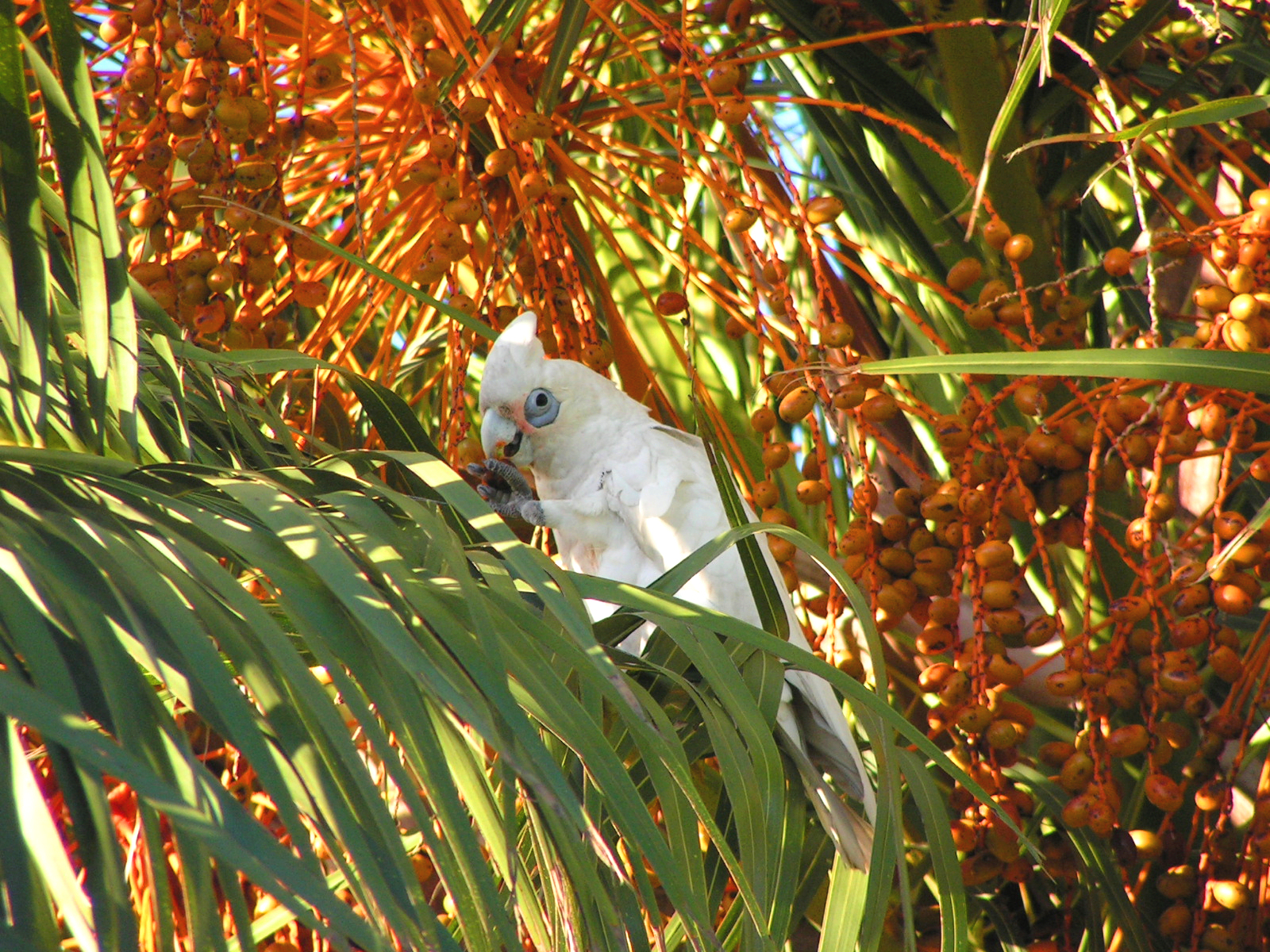
Cacatua pastinator pastinator in Perth, Western Australia

The two separate populations described as subspecies occur in south-west Western Australia. The population occurring in the northern wheatbelt of south-western Australia consist of 5000–10000 birds while the population in the far south west of Western Australia consists of approximately 1000 birds. The two isolated populations each consist of one of the identified sub species. Butler's corella (Cacatua pastinator butleri) occurs in the northern and central wheatbelt of Western Australia whilst Muir's corella (Cacatua pastinator pastinator) occurs in the very south-west area of Western Australia.

Historical records indicate the species was common at the time of colonisation of Western Australia, and continued to be seen in large flocks during the nineteenth century. The absence of records by the early collector John Gilbert's suggests that this corella was abundant and ubiquitous.

The habitat of Cacatua pastinator consists of undulating land with low relief (less than 100 m) with more than 90% of native vegetation cleared for farming of wheat and sheep. The remaining woodland and shrub vegetation communities are restricted to small isolated patches and road reserves. Habitat critical to Cacatua pastinator comprises large eucalypts and other trees (either alive or dead) in forested areas or as lone paddock trees and roadside vegetation, preferred tree species are marri (Corymbia calophylla), jarrah (Eucalyptus marginata), moitch (Eucalyptus rudis), yate (Eucalyptus cornuta) and the paperbark, moonah (Melaleuca preissiana).

Cacatua pastinator have displayed three phases of movement patterns within the central wheatbelt of Western Australia, these phases are dependent on the age of the birds. Breeding takes place in spring, following fledging of nestlings the family groups join up with immature flocks and move to summer feeding locations, during the following month the young are weaned and the parents move back to the breeding ground during the January – March period, the juveniles do not return until May or June. Although there is some dispersal to other breeding areas, most individuals display attachment to their natal area with some birds being known to return after being absent for up to five years.

== Threats and recovery actions ==
The habit of some cockatoos to form large flocks and their ability to exploit resources provided by man has often brought them into conflict with landholders. The exploitation of cereal crops during the late 1800s and early 1900s resulted in widespread shooting and poisoning of large numbers of Cacatua pastinator, this persecution was the likely cause of a rapid decline in the range of its sub species' and population numbers. The population decline of the species was examined by the Western Australian ornithologist Tom Carter, summarised in a report published by the Ibis in 1912. By the 1920s there were only two populations remaining, the northern population of Cacatua pastinator butleri, and the southern population of Cacatua pastinator pastinator which declined to approximately 100 birds in 1921. The southern population continued to decline until the 1940s. The northern population has expanded eastwards since the low of the 1930s following agricultural development. Since the period of decline at the turn of the twentieth century the population of both sub-species has steadily increased. In the last 50 years the release from persecution by landowners, together with their adaptability, has allowed an expansion of range into the Western Australia wheatbelt which provides abundant food and water supplies.

Cacatua pastinator butleri is not listed as a species of conservation concern. Cacatua pastinator pastinator is listed as a species of Specially Protected Fauna – Schedule 4. Muir's Corella (Cacatua pastinator pastinator) is listed by the Western Australian Threatened Species Scientific Committee as Endangered using the IUCN (2001) Red list Categories and Criteria and this listing has been endorsed by the Western Australian Minister of the Environment. Cacatua pastinator pastinator has been listed as Vulnerable under the Commonwealth Environment Protection and Biodiversity Conservation Act 1999.

The threatening processes for Cacatua pastinator pastinator are:

- Killing by illegal shooting and poisoning
- Habitat loss
- Changes in land use
- Nest hollow shortage
- Competition for available nest hollows and killing by feral Honeybees.

Recovery actions identified for Cacatua pastinator pastinator are:

- Seek the funding required to implement future recovery actions
- Determine population numbers, distribution and movements
- Identify factors affecting the number of breeding attempts and breeding success and manage nest hollows to increase recruitment
- Map feeding and breeding habitat critical to survival of all wild and translocated populations, and prepare management guidelines for these habitats
- Revegetate with favoured hollow-bearing trees
- Determine and implement ways to remove feral Honeybees from nesting hollows
- Produce an information kit to help eliminate illegal killing and distribute to the wider community
- Prevent the spread of non-endemic Corella populations in south-west Western Australia
- Collect DNA samples and analyse to determine the taxonomic status of Cacatua pastinator subspecies.

== Behaviour ==
Cacatua pastinator are an iconic species of bird in Western Australia. They are often conspicuous in large flocks of up to 700 birds during summer which move around the areas spending days or week in any one location feeding and behaving raucously. The flocks of immature birds and breeding pairs and the foraging occurred up to 10 km from their nest trees. The breeding pairs of tend to be stable but a moderate rate of divorce of about 15% has been observed.

Flocks of Corellas are often very noisy and can be heard from a considerable distance. The call of the Corella is a wavering falsetto with distinctly eerie or ghostly tonal qualities. They also have various shrieks and quaverings of squeaky conversational tones.

=== Breeding ===
Cacatua pastinator nest in hollows in large eucalypt trees and occasionally other tree species such as paperbarks. The preferred nesting trees are large live or dead eucalypts, particularly marri (Corymbia calophylla) and jarrah (Eucalyptus marginata), located in remnant woodlands, in forested areas, along road corridors or as lone paddock trees. The Corellas prefer to nest in trees with open canopies and some dead limbs but will nest in dead trees when there is an adjacent healthy tree in which the bird can shelter. Corellas appear to nest close to other pairs and will utilise the same nesting hollow for up to six seasons.

Nesting hollows are located 6–20 metres (20–66 ft) above the ground, have entrances 15–40 centimetres (5.9–15.7 in) wide orientated to avoid flooding and winds during breeding, and the hollow is 0.5–2 metres (1.6–6.6 ft) deep. The bark is removed from around the entrance to the hollow and eggs are laid on rotten wood or wood dust in the base of the hollow.

Cacatua pastinator commence laying eggs in August and continue through until October with the majority of eggs being laid late August and early September. The clutch size ranges from one to four eggs with the mean clutch size being three. The mean length and diameter of the eggs is 41.8 millimetres (1.65 in) and 30.5 millimetres (1.20 in), respectively, and the fresh egg mass averaged 21.6 grams (0.76 oz). As the season progresses clutch sizes decrease suggesting that some females are more efficient foragers who breed earlier and lay larger clutches than others.

Cacatua pastinator form monogamous relationships for breeding and raising young. The pairs remain together during both daily and seasonal movements with exceptions being when one partner is breeding or brooding; the nest tree is also the focus of their activities when they are in the breeding area. Incubation commences at about the time when the second egg is laid and incubation duties are shared among both the males and females with the incubation period lasting 22 to 23 days. Brood reduction was common with the youngest nestling dying within two weeks.

The breeding success rate of Cacatua pastinator is quite high. Several cockatoo species have egg hatch rates of approximately 63%. Cacatua pastinator have had hatching rates recorded slightly higher than this with the hatching success of 233 eggs being 67.2%. The mean brood size was 1.9 however breeding productivity in Corellas when measured as the number of nestlings fledged and the number of fledglings reaching independence both increased with increasing clutch and brood sizes.

The nestlings remain in the nest for a period ranging between 53 and 67 days with one or the other parent spending up to 98% of their time brooding the chicks in the first week with this reducing rapidly and ceasing when the chicks are about 25 days old. The chicks reach the stage of independence after about three months.

Cacatua pastinator have some of the highest survival rates of any species of birds. Survival to independence at three months has been recorded at 77.4%, to one year at 50.8%, whilst 23.2% of females survived to breed at three years, 13.6% at four years, and only 9% at five years. Males also start breeding at five years, by which age only about 9% of the original cohort had survived. Factors causing mortality, particularly of immature birds, including predation by Falcons (Falco spp) or other birds of prey, road deaths and shooting or poisoning by humans. Longevity is unknown for wild birds, but is up to 26 years for captive C. pastinator subspecies.

=== Feeding ===
Cacatua pastinator have benefited greatly from food supplies provided as a result of agricultural activities, however, the exploitation of these food supplies has led to their persecution, which has had detrimental effects on their population. As with all parrots, Corellas are mostly seed eaters but can vary their diet depending on habitat and food availability.

Cacatua pastinator eats wheat grain and native seeds during December to April; bulbs and corms which are dug out of the ground with the long-tipped bill, most commonly Romulea rosea (Onion Grass), are the most common diet item during May to November. During late winter and spring insect larvae form an important part of the diet for Corellas, both for adults and nestlings, with the exoskeleton being discarded and the larvae gutted before it is fed to the young. Most feeding occurs in large open areas such as pasture and crops but Corellas have been known to feed in cattle feedlots. Corellas have been observed feeding on marri (Corymbia calophylla) seeds by holding the capsule and tipping the seed into their mouth, and feeding on wheat by bending the seed heads down to pluck out the grains.

== Aviculture ==
This species has the ability to mimic clearly and, like other cockatoos, bonds strongly to its owner. The western corella may show aggression to other birds in the aviary. It is not as common in aviculture as the little corella or long-billed corella.

The Noongar peoples have used the feathers of this species as an adornment for a headband or placed in their hair. Consumption of this corella by the Indigenous inhabitants of Southwest Australia is undocumented, but assumed from methods that could be employed, using a wounded bird near a pool of water as a decoy, and the reports of English colonists that it was a wholesome and good tasting meal.

== Status and conservation ==
While generally uncommon, it has expanded its range in recent decades, and is therefore listed as of least concern by BirdLife International. However, the nominate subspecies, Muir's corella, is relatively rare, with a population of around 3000 individuals, and is considered to be nationally Vulnerable.
