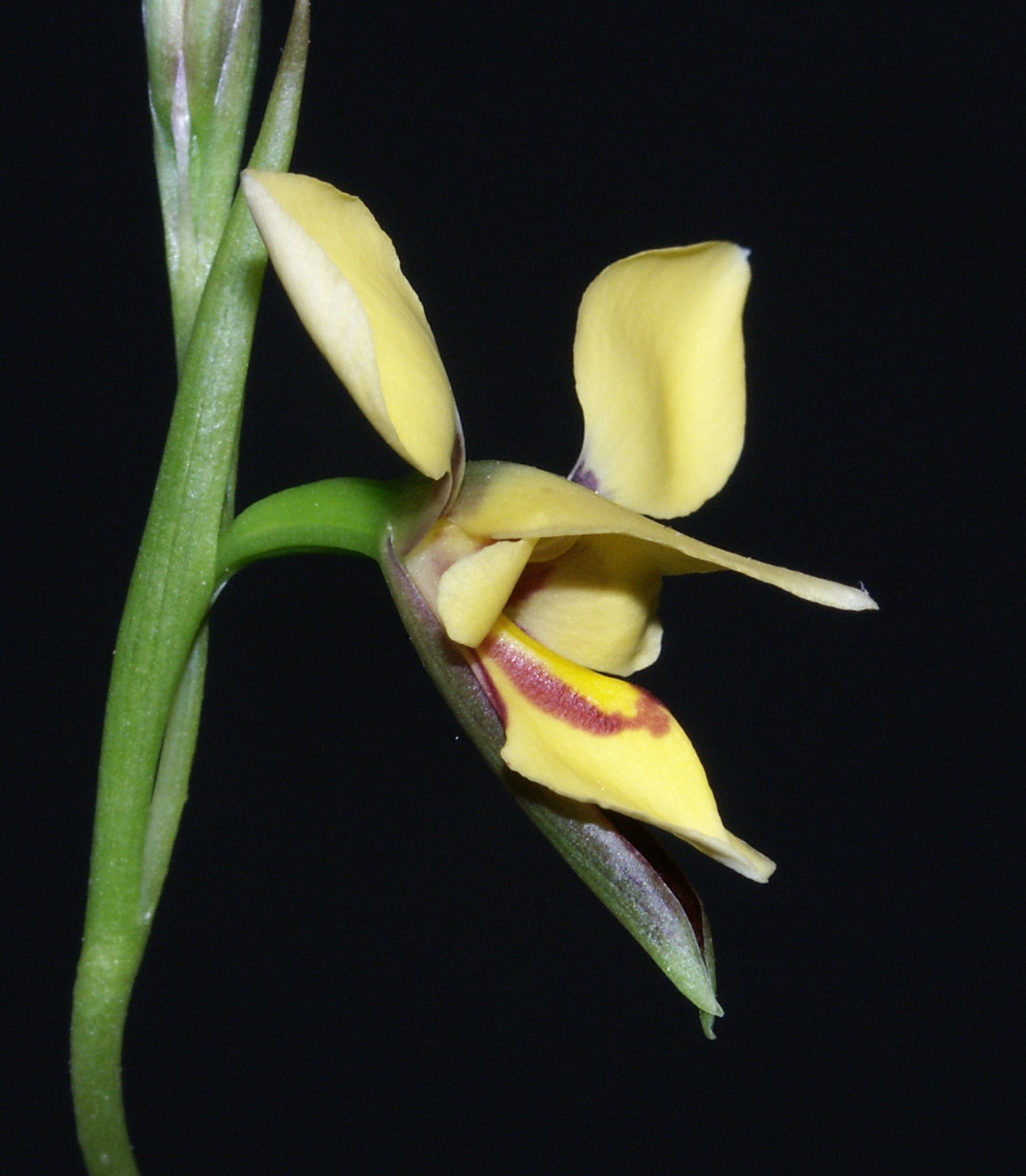

Conservation status
- Declared rare (DEC)

Scientific classification
- Kingdom: Plantae
- Clade: Tracheophytes
- Clade: Angiosperms
- Clade: Monocots
- Order: Asparagales
- Family: Orchidaceae
- Subfamily: Orchidoideae
- Tribe: Diurideae
- Genus: Diuris
- Species: D. drummondii

Binomial name
- Diuris drummondii Lindl.

= Diuris drummondii =

Tall donkey orchid

Species of orchid endemic to South Western Australia

Diuris drummondii, commonly known as the tall donkey orchid is a species of orchid which is endemic to the south-west of Western Australia. It is the tallest Diuris and is distinguished from the similar Diuris emarginata by its larger, more widely spaced flowers. The flowers are pale yellow with brown markings.

== Description ==
Diuris drummondii is a tuberous, perennial herb, growing to a height of 50–1,500 mm (2–60 in) with between three and six leaves, each 150–250 mm (6–10 in) long and 5–8 mm (0.2–0.3 in) wide. There are between three and seven pale yellow flowers with brown markings and 30–35 mm (1.2–1.4 in) wide. The dorsal sepal is erect, 18–22 mm (0.7–0.9 in) long, 9–12 mm (0.4–0.5 in) wide. The lateral sepals are 18–24 mm (0.7–0.9 in) long, 4–5 mm (0.16–0.20 in) wide and turned downwards. The petals are held ear-like above the rest of the flower with the blade 17–20 mm (0.7–0.8 in) long and 10–13 mm (0.4–0.5 in) wide on a blackish stalk 6–8 mm (0.2–0.3 in) long. The labellum is 17–22 mm (0.7–0.9 in) long and has three lobes. The centre lobe is broadly egg-shaped, 15–18 mm (0.6–0.7 in) long and 13–16 mm (0.5–0.6 in) wide and the side lobes are 7–11 mm (0.3–0.4 in) long and 5–8 mm (0.2–0.3 in) wide. There are two parallel callus ridges 6–8 mm (0.2–0.3 in) long and edged with brown in the mid-line of the labellum. Flowering occurs from November to January and is enhanced by fire the previous summer followed by heavy winter rains.

== Taxonomy and naming ==
Diuris drummondii was first formally described in 1840 by John Lindley and the description was published in A Sketch of the Vegetation of the Swan River Colony as an appendix to Edwards's Botanical Register. The specific epithet (drummondii) honours James Drummond who collected the type specimen.

== Distribution and habitat ==
The tall donkey orchid grows in winter-wet depressions that retain at least some moisture until summer, and often flowers with its base submerged. It is found between Northampton and Mount Barker in the Avon Wheatbelt, Jarrah Forest, Swan Coastal Plain and Warren biogeographic regions.

== Conservation ==
Diuris drummondii is classified as "Threatened Flora (Declared Rare Flora — Extant)" by the Western Australian Government Department of Parks and Wildlife.
