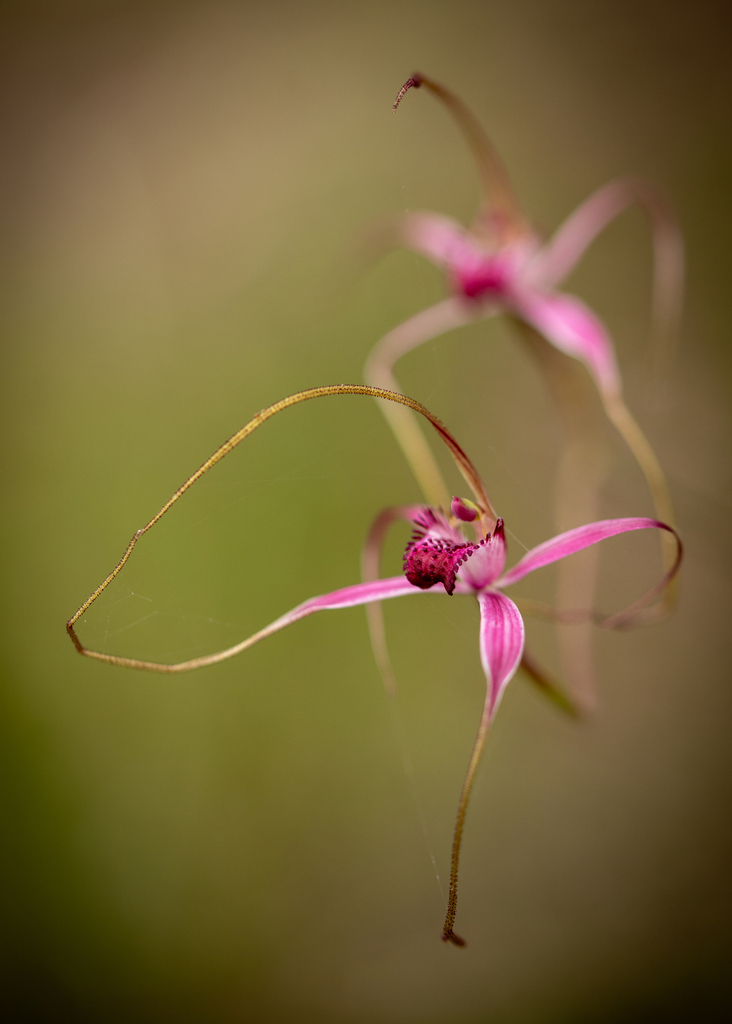
- Near Lake Muir National Park

Conservation status
- Vulnerable (EPBC Act)

Scientific classification
- Kingdom: Plantae
- Clade: Embryophytes
- Clade: Tracheophytes
- Clade: Spermatophytes
- Clade: Angiosperms
- Clade: Monocots
- Order: Asparagales
- Family: Orchidaceae
- Subfamily: Orchidoideae
- Tribe: Diurideae
- Genus: Caladenia
- Species: C. harringtoniae

Binomial name
- Caladenia harringtoniae Hopper & A.P.Br.

Synonyms
- Calonemorchis harringtoniae (Hopper & A.P.Br.) Szlach. and Rutk.

= Caladenia harringtoniae =

Pink spider orchid

Species of orchid

Caladenia harringtoniae, commonly known as the pink spider orchid, is a species of orchid endemic to the south-west of Western Australia. It has a single, hairy leaf and up to three pale to deep pink flowers which have a cream-coloured labellum with a pink tip.

== Description ==
Caladenia harringtoniae is a terrestrial, perennial, deciduous, herb with an underground tuber and a single erect, hairy leaf, 150–250 mm (6–10 in) long and 6–10 mm (0.2–0.4 in) wide. Up to three flowers 70–100 mm (3–4 in) long and 50–70 mm (2–3 in) wide are borne on a stalk 200–400 mm (8–20 in) tall. The flowers are pale pink to deep pink with spreading lateral sepals and petals. The dorsal sepal is erect, 45–70 mm (2–3 in) long and 2–3 mm (0.08–0.1 in) wide, the lateral sepals are 50–80 mm (2–3 in) long and 4–7 mm (0.2–0.3 in) wide and the petals are 35–45 mm (1–2 in) long and 3–4 mm (0.1–0.2 in) wide. The labellum is cream-coloured, 13–18 mm (0.5–0.7 in) long and 7–12 mm (0.3–0.5 in) wide with a pink tip. The sides of the labellum have erect, spreading, red teeth up to 5 mm (0.2 in) long and there are four rows of pink calli up to 1.5 mm (0.06 in) long, along the centre of the labellum. Flowering occurs from mid-September to early November.

== Taxonomy and naming ==
Caladenia harringtoniae was first described in 2001 by Stephen Hopper and Andrew Phillip Brown from a specimen collected near Pemberton and the description was published in Nuytsia. The specific epithet (harringtoniae) honours Alison Harrington, a president of the Western Australia Native Orchid Study Group.

== Distribution and habitat ==
The pink spider orchid occurs between Nannup and Albany in the Jarrah Forest and Warren biogeographic regions, where it grows swamps and flat areas that are flooded in winter.

== Conservation ==
Caladenia harringtoniae is classified as "Threatened Flora (Declared Rare Flora — Extant)" by the Western Australian Government Department of Parks and Wildlife and as "vulnerable" by the Australian Government Environment Protection and Biodiversity Conservation Act 1999. The main threats to the species are fire during its growth and flowering period, grazing by feral pigs (Sus scrofa) and road maintenance activities.
