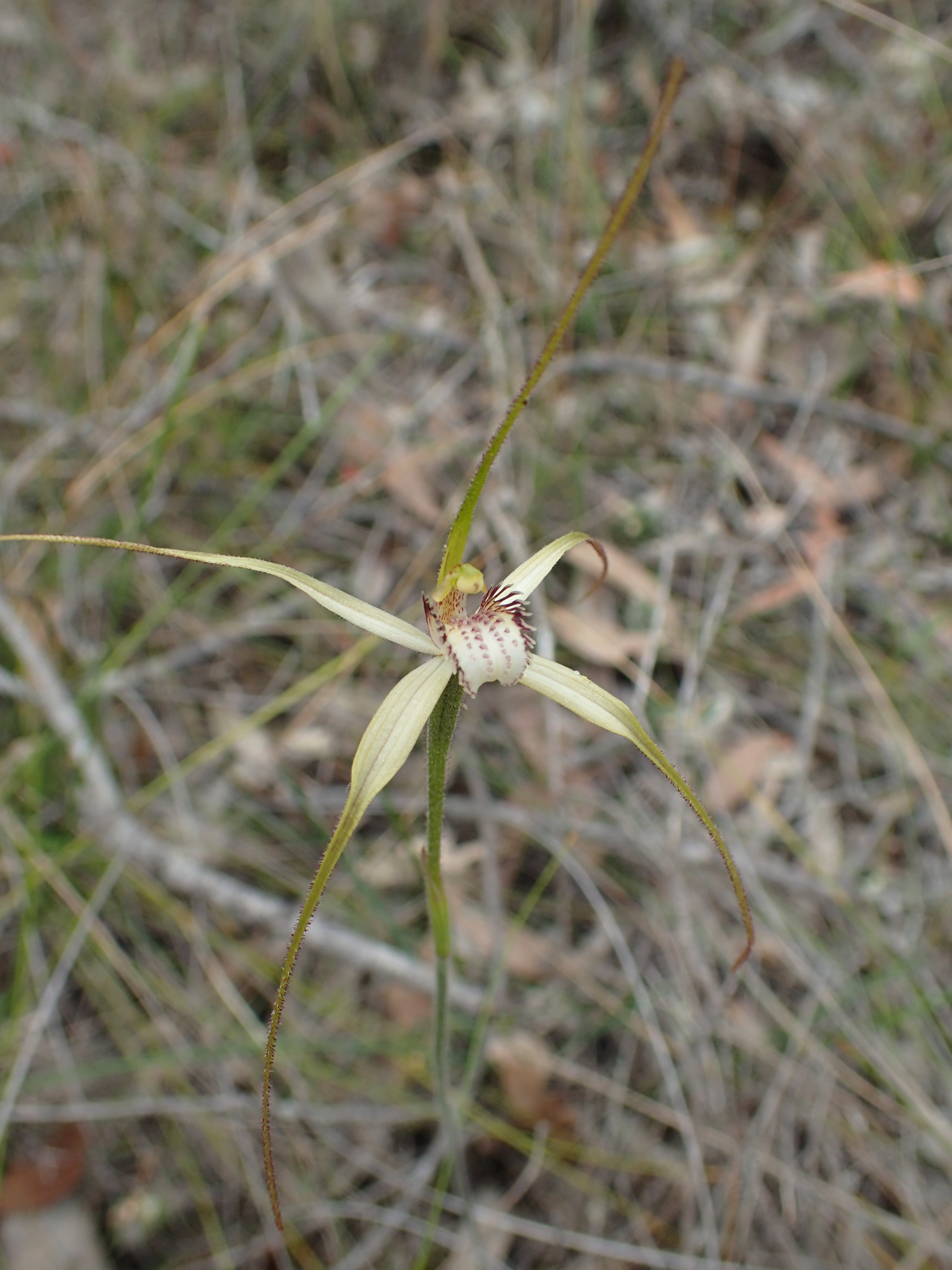
- Near Rocky Gully

Conservation status
- Vulnerable (EPBC Act)

Scientific classification
- Kingdom: Plantae
- Clade: Tracheophytes
- Clade: Angiosperms
- Clade: Monocots
- Order: Asparagales
- Family: Orchidaceae
- Subfamily: Orchidoideae
- Tribe: Diurideae
- Genus: Caladenia
- Species: C. christineae

Binomial name
- Caladenia christineae Hopper & A.P.Br.

Synonyms
- Arachnorchis chlorostylus (Hopper & A.P.Br.) D.L.Jones & M.A.Clem.

= Caladenia christineae =

Christine's spider orchid

Species of orchid

Caladenia christineae, commonly known as Christine's spider orchid, is a plant in the orchid family Orchidaceae and is endemic to the south-west of Western Australia. It has a single erect, hairy leaf and up to four small, white to cream-coloured flowers. It is distinguished from similar spider orchids by its small, odourless flowers with their stiffly held sepals and petals.

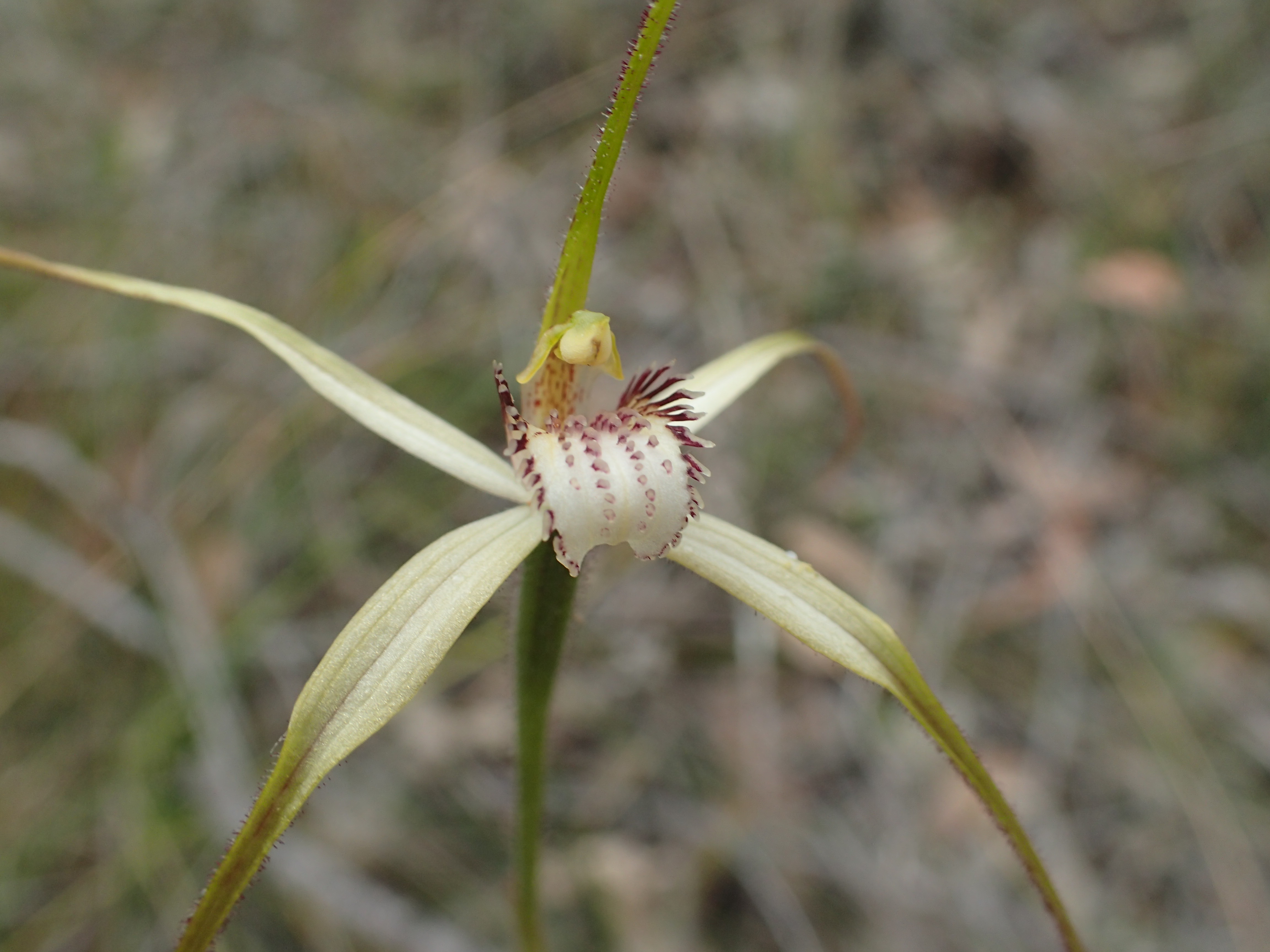
labellum detail

== Description ==
Caladenia christineae is a terrestrial, perennial, deciduous, herb with an underground tuber and a single erect, hairy leaf 6–20 cm (2–8 in) long and 4–12 mm (0.2–0.5 in) wide. Up to four flowers are arranged on the flowering spike, each flower 7–10 cm (3–4 in) long and 6–8 cm (2–3 in) wide. The flowers are creamy-white or creamy-yellow with lateral sepals, and petals that are held stiffly, spreading widely from each other. The labellum is cream coloured and has narrow teeth on its margins. There are four or more rows of pale red calli along the centre line of the labellum. Flowering occurs in September or October.

== Taxonomy and naming ==
Caladenia christineae was first formally described by Stephen Hopper and Andrew Brown in 2001 from a specimen collected near Rocky Gully. The description was published in Nuytsia. The specific epithet (christineae) honours Christine Hopper, the wife of the co-author of this orchid's description.

== Distribution and habitat ==
Christine's spider orchid is known from 28 populations between Yornup, Bridgetown and Mt Barker in the Jarrah Forest and Warren biogeographic regions.

== Conservation ==
Caladenia christineae is classified as "vulnerable" by the Environment Protection and Biodiversity Conservation Act 1999 and as "Threatened Flora (Declared Rare Flora — Extant)" by the Department of Environment and Conservation (Western Australia) meaning that it is likely to become extinct or is rare, or otherwise in need of special protection. The main threats to this species are fire between May and November, weeds, salinity, clearing, road maintenance and grazing.
