= Caladenia × aestantha =

Scientific classification
- Kingdom: Plantae
- Clade: Tracheophytes
- Clade: Angiosperms
- Clade: Monocots
- Order: Asparagales
- Family: Orchidaceae
- Subfamily: Orchidoideae
- Tribe: Diurideae
- Genus: Caladenia
- Species: C. × aestantha

Binomial name
- Caladenia × aestantha Hopper & A.P.Br.

Synonyms
- Arachnorchis × aestantha (Hopper & A.P.Br.) D.L.Jones & M.A.Clem.

Species of orchid endemic to Western Australia

Caladenia × aestantha, commonly known as summer spider orchid, is a species of flowering plant in the orchid family Orchidaceae and is endemic to the south coast of Western Australia. It is a rare, natural occurring hybrid between Caladenia corynephora and Caladenia serotina.

== Description ==
Caladenia × aestantha is a herb with an underground tuber and a single erect, hairy leaf 120–180 mm (4.7–7.1 in) long and 12–18 mm (0.47–0.71 in) wide. One or two white, yellow and red flowers 40–60 mm (2–2 in) wide are borne on a spike 200–350 millimetres (7.9–13.8 in) high. It differs from C. corynephora in its paler flowers and longer lateral sepals (up to 50 mm (2.0 in) long), and lacks glandular hairs on the ends of its sepals and petals. Flowering occurs from late November to January.

== Taxonomy ==
Caladenia × aestantha was first formally described in 2001 by Stephen Hopper and Andrew Brown from specimens collected by Brown on the edge of the Scott River Plain in 1986. The specific epithet (aestantha) means summer flower, and alludes to the summer flowering period of this hybrid.

== Distribution and habitat ==
This orchid has a restricted distribution along the south coast of Western Australia in moist sites between Albany and Augusta.

== Conservation status ==
Caladenia × aestantha is listed as 'not threatened' by the Government of Western Australia Department of Biodiversity, Conservation and Attractions.
