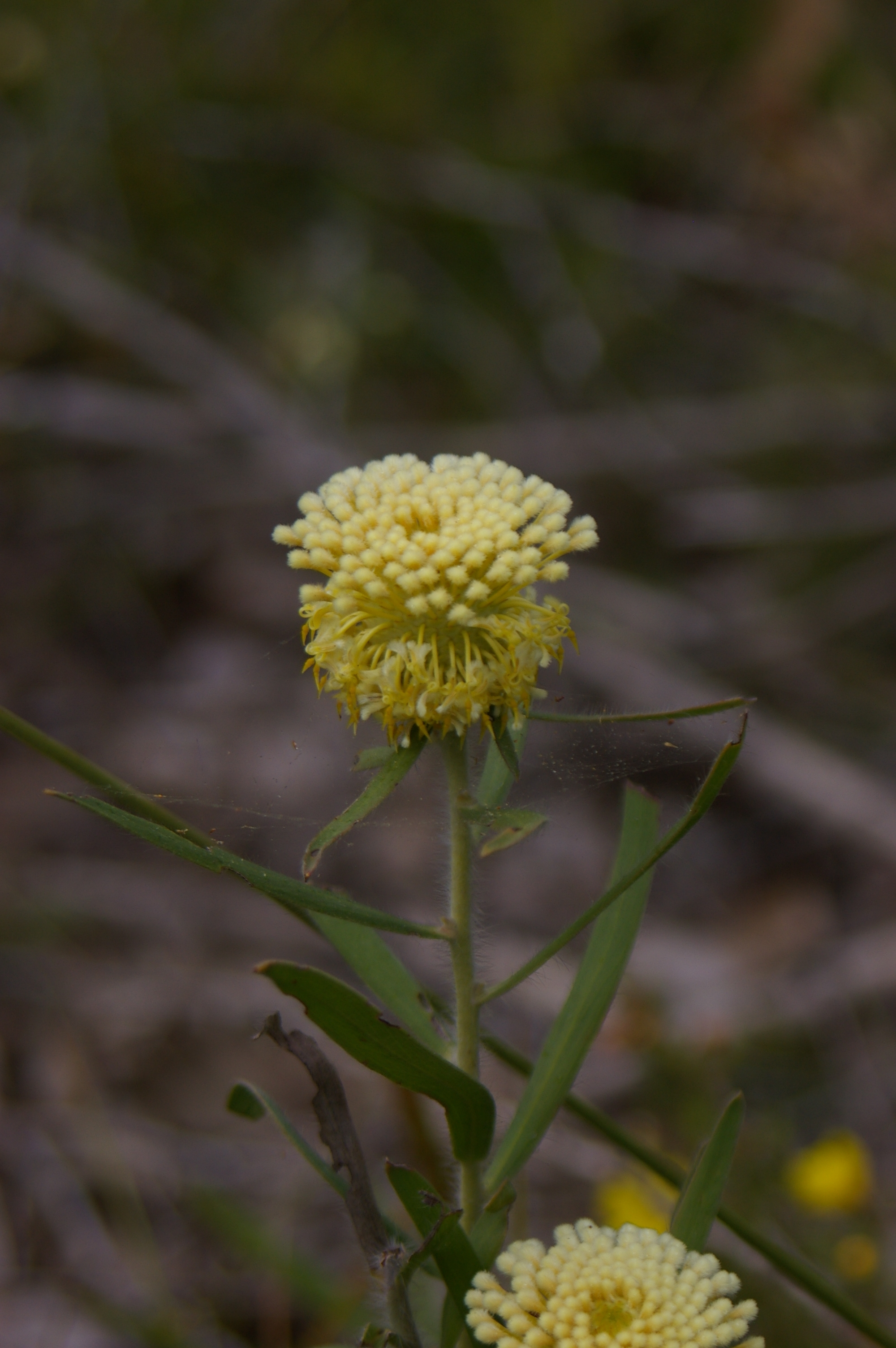
- In John Forrest National Park

Scientific classification
- Kingdom: Plantae
- Clade: Tracheophytes
- Clade: Angiosperms
- Clade: Eudicots
- Order: Proteales
- Family: Proteaceae
- Genus: Isopogon
- Species: I. sphaerocephalus

Binomial name
- Isopogon sphaerocephalus Lindl.
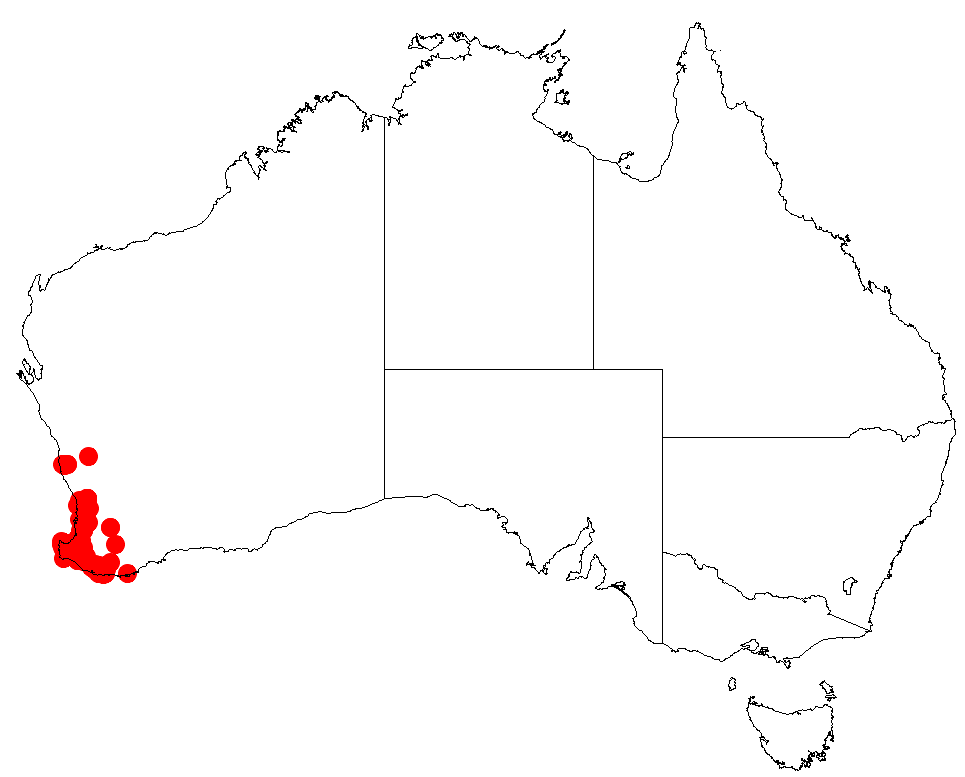
- Occurrence data from Australasian Virtual Herbarium

Synonyms
- Atylus sphaerocephalus (Lindl.) Kuntze; Isopogon eriocladus Gand.; Isopogon ovoideus Gand.

= Isopogon sphaerocephalus =

Drumstick isopogon

Species of shrub endemic to Western Australia

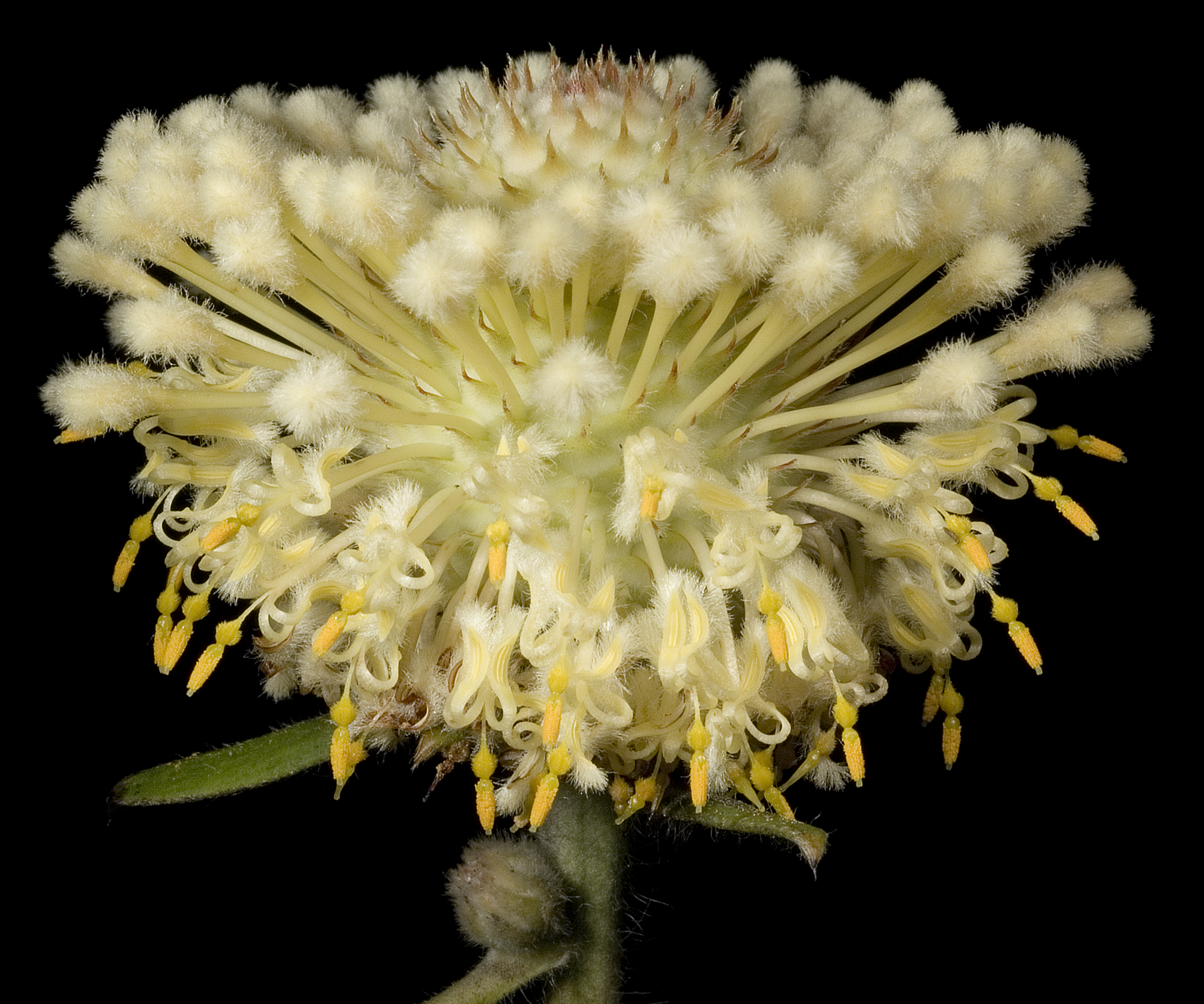
Flower detail

Isopogon sphaerocephalus, commonly known as drumstick isopogon or Lesueur isopogon, is a species of plant in the family Proteaceae and is endemic to the south-west of Western Australia. It is a shrub with linear to narrow egg-shaped leaves and spherical heads of hairy white to creamy yellow flowers.

== Description ==
Isopogon sphaerocaphalus is a shrub that typically grows to a height of 0.3–2 m (1 ft 0 in – 6 ft 7 in) and has hairy brownish young branchlets and hairy young leaves. The leaves are linear to egg-shaped with the narrower end towards the base, 50–160 mm (2.0–6.3 in) long and 4–18 mm (0.16–0.71 in) wide with a small point on the end. The flowers are arranged on the ends of branchlets in sessile, spherical heads 25–30 mm (0.98–1.18 in) in diameter with hairy, egg-shaped involucral bracts at the base. The flowers are densely hairy, white to pale or creamy yellow and up to 15 mm (0.59 in) long. Flowering occurs from July to January and the fruit is a hairy nut, fused with others in a conical to oblong head 20–30 mm (0.79–1.18 in) in diameter.

== Taxonomy ==
Isopogon sphaerocephalus was first formally described by botanist John Lindley in A sketch of the vegetation of the Swan River Colony in 1839.

In 2019, Barbara Lynette Rye described two subspecies of I. sphaerocephalus in the journal Nuytsia but the names have not been assessed by the Australian Plant Census as at November 2020:

- Isopogon sphaerocephalus Lindl. subsp. sphaerocephalus, commonly known as "drumstick isopogon";
- Isopogon sphaerocephalus subsp. lesueurensis Rye, commonly known as "Lesueur isopogon" has a longer pollen presenter, hairier branchlets and leaves and more crowded, broader leaves than the autonym.

The specific epithet (sphaerocephalus) means "spherical-headed", and lesueurensis refers to Mount Lesueur, where this subspecies occurs.

== Distribution and habitat ==
Subspecies sphaerocephalus grows in jarrah forest between Gidgegannup, the Scott River area and the Kent River in the Jarrah Forest, Mallee, Swan Coastal Plain and Warren biogeographic regions. Subspecies lesueurensis grows in shrubland on and near the sides and bases of hills in the Mount Lesueur area.

== Conservation status ==
Both subspecies of I. sphaerocephalus are listed as "not threatened" by the Western Australian Government Department of Parks and Wildlife.
