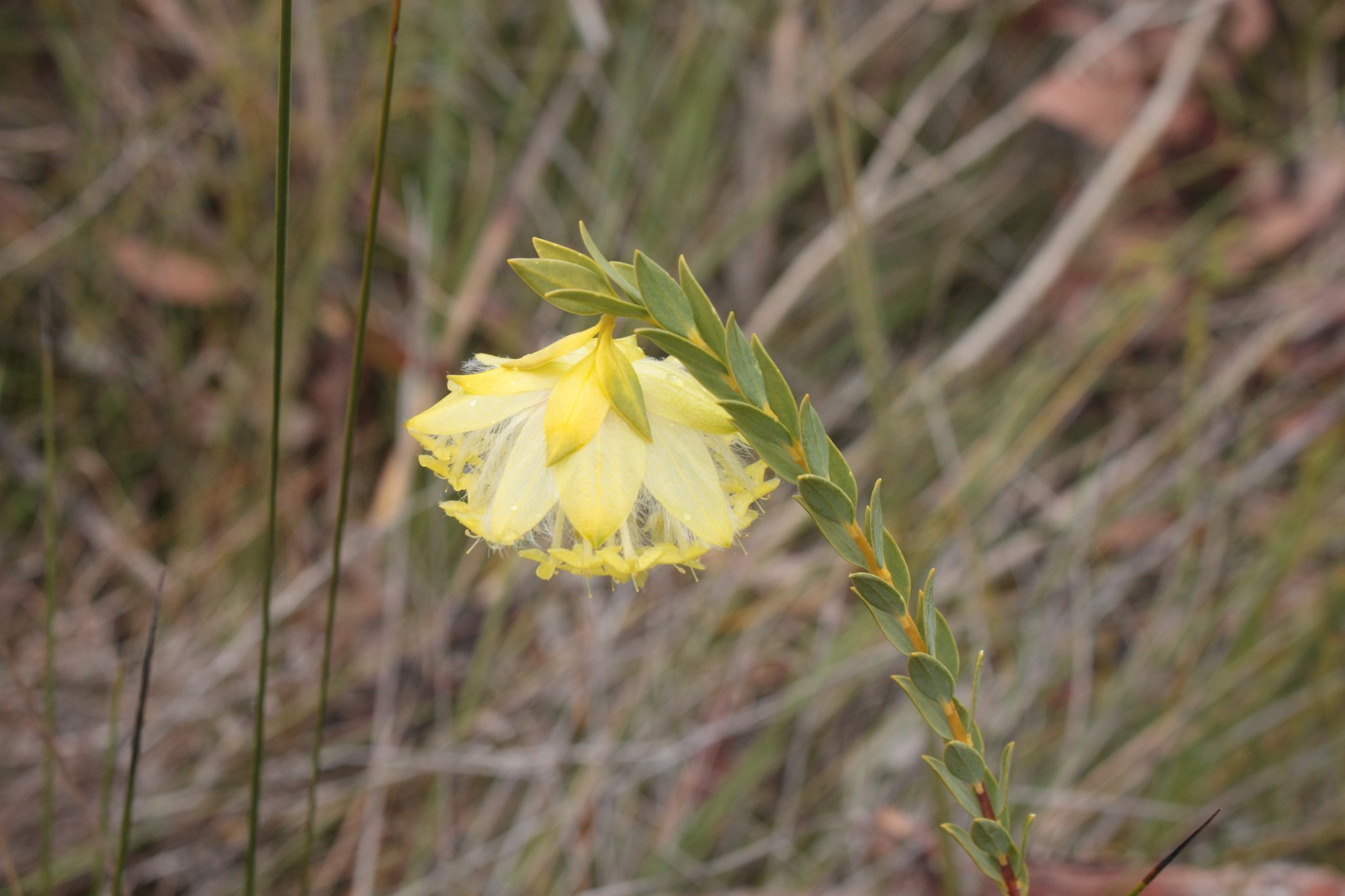
- In Mount Lindesay National Park

Scientific classification
- Kingdom: Plantae
- Clade: Tracheophytes
- Clade: Angiosperms
- Clade: Eudicots
- Clade: Rosids
- Order: Malvales
- Family: Thymelaeaceae
- Genus: Pimelea
- Species: P. tinctoria

Binomial name
- Pimelea tinctoria Meisn.

Synonyms
- Banksia tinctoria (Meisn.) Kuntze nom. illeg.; Calyptrostegia tinctoria (Meisn.) Endl.; Pimelea suaveolens var. tinctoria (Meisn.) Benth.

= Pimelea tinctoria =

Species of shrub

Pimelea tinctoria is a species of flowering plant in the family Thymelaeaceae and is endemic to the south-west of Western Australia. It is an erect, spindly shrub with elliptic leaves arranged in opposite pairs, and compact heads of many yellow or yellowish-green flowers usually surrounded by 4 to 7 pairs of egg-shaped to narrowly elliptic yellow and green involucral bracts.

== Description ==
Pimelea tinctoria is an erect, spindly shrub that typically grows to a height of 0.5–1 m (1 ft 8 in – 3 ft 3 in) and has a single stem at ground level. The stems and leaves are glabrous, the leaves arranged in opposite pairs, elliptic, 9–21 mm (0.35–0.83 in) long and 4–10 mm (0.16–0.39 in) wide on a short petiole. The flowers are bisexual, arranged in pendulous, compact heads, surrounded by 4 to 7 pairs of egg-shaped to narrowly elliptic, yellow and green involucral bracts 18–27 mm (0.71–1.06 in) long and 6–17 mm (0.24–0.67 in) wide. Each flower is on a hairy pedicel 0.5–2 mm (0.020–0.079 in) long, the flower tube 17–22 mm (0.67–0.87 in) long, the sepals 3.5–5.5 mm (0.14–0.22 in) long, the stamens shorter than the sepals. Flowering occurs from August to October.

== Taxonomy ==
Pimelea tinctoria was first formally described in 1845 by Carl Meissner in Lehmann's Plantae Preissianae from specimens collected on mountains near "Wuljenup" (Woogenellup?) in the Shire of Plantagenet. The specific epithet (tinctoria) means "used in dyeing".

== Distribution and habitat ==
This pimelea grows in sandy soil in shrubland and clearings in near-coastal areas mainly from near Denmark to near Cape Riche, and in the Stirling Range, in the Esperance Plains, Jarrah Forest and Warren bioregions of south-western Western Australia.

== Conservation status ==
Pimelea tinctoria is listed as "not threatened" by the Government of Western Australia Department of Biodiversity, Conservation and Attractions.
