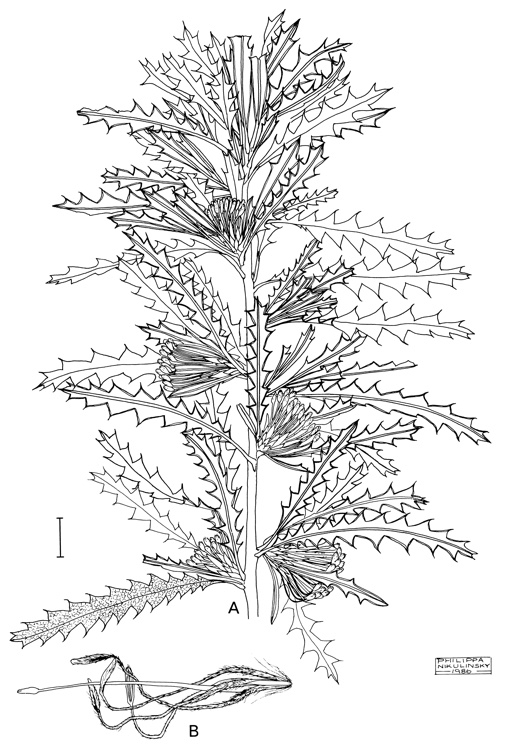
- Illustration of Banksia serra by Philippa Nikulinsky

Conservation status
- Near Threatened (IUCN 3.1)

- Priority Four — Rare Taxa (DEC)

Scientific classification
- Kingdom: Plantae
- Clade: Tracheophytes
- Clade: Angiosperms
- Clade: Eudicots
- Order: Proteales
- Family: Proteaceae
- Genus: Banksia
- Subgenus: Banksia subg. Banksia
- Series: Banksia ser. Dryandra
- Species: B. serra

Binomial name
- Banksia serra (R.Br.) A.R.Mast & K.R.Thiele

Synonyms
- Dryandra serra R.Br.; Josephia serra (R.Br.) Kuntze

= Banksia serra =

Serrate-leaved dryandra

Species of shrub endemic to Western Australia

Banksia serra, commonly known as serrate-leaved dryandra, is a species of shrub that is endemic to Western Australia. It has broadly linear, serrated leaves, pale yellow flowers in heads of about thirty and egg-shaped follicles.

== Description ==
Banksia serra is a shrub that typically grows to a height of 6 m (20 ft) but does not form a lignotuber. It has slender stems and broadly linear leaves 30–150 mm (1.2–5.9 in) long and 5–15 mm (0.20–0.59 in) wide on a petiole 4–10 mm (0.16–0.39 in) long. There are between eight and twenty broadly triangular serrations on each side of the leaves. Between twenty and thirty-six pale yellow flowers are arranged in heads with narrow egg-shaped to lance-shaped involucral bracts 6–8 mm (0.24–0.31 in) long at the base of each head. The perianth is 16–19 mm (0.63–0.75 in) long and more or less straight, and the pistil is 19–21 mm (0.75–0.83 in) long with a green pollen presenter. Flowering occurs from July to October and the follicles are egg-shaped but curved, 12–18 mm (0.47–0.71 in) long.

== Taxonomy and naming ==
This species was first formally described in 1830 by Robert Brown who gave it the name Dryandra serra and published the description in the Supplementum primum Prodromi florae Novae Hollandiae from specimens collected by William Baxter near King George's Sound in 1829. The specific epithet (serra) is a Latin word meaning "saw", referring to the leaves.

In 2007, Austin Mast and Kevin Thiele transferred all the dryandras to the genus Banksia and this species became Banksia serra.

== Distribution and habitat ==
Banksia serra grows in woodland, forest and mallee-kwongan from the Bow River to Mount Manypeaks.

== Ecology ==
An assessment of the potential impact of climate change on this species found that its range is likely to contract by between 30% and 80% by 2080, depending on the severity of the change.

== Conservation status ==
This banksia is classified as not threatened by the Western Australian Government Department of Parks and Wildlife.
