= Walpole Wilderness Area =

Group of conservation reserves in Western Australia

- IUCN category II (national park)
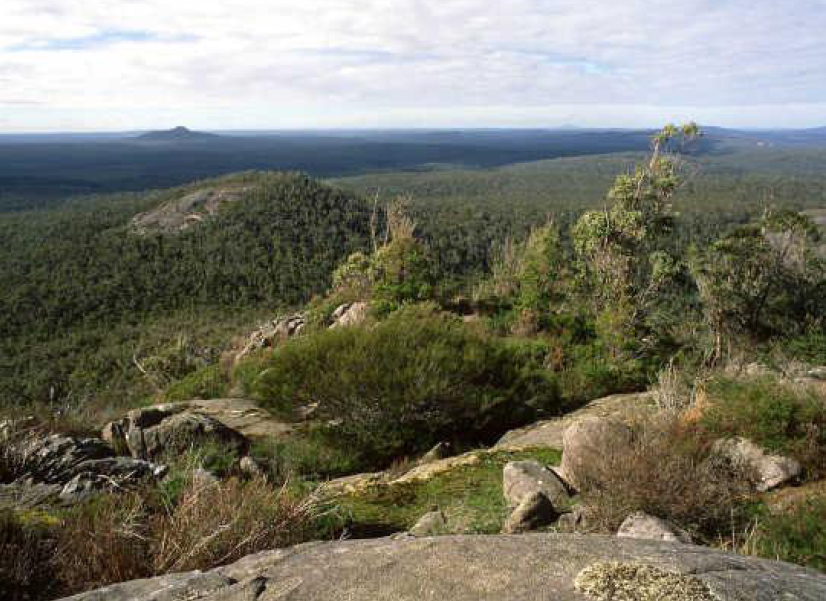
- Walpole Wilderness Area

- Location within Western Australia
- Location: Western Australia
- Nearest city: Walpole
- Coordinates: 34°59′S 116°46′E
- Area: 3,633.33 km^{2} (1,402.84 sq mi)
- Established: 1957
- Governing body: Department of Environment and Conservation

The Walpole Wilderness Area is a group of conservation reserves on the south coast of Western Australia. The area includes vast tracts of jarrah, red tingle and karri forests surrounding granite peaks, rivers, heathlands, and wetlands. Coastal features include inlets and sandy beaches, sheer cliffs and the Southern Ocean.

== Geography ==
The planning area, together with the Shannon and D'Entrecasteaux National Parks, provide a contiguous conservation reserve system stretching from near Augusta in the west to Denmark in the east.

The Walpole Wilderness incorporates:

- Boyndaminup National Park
- Kordabup Nature Reserve
- Mehniup Nature Reserve
- Mount Frankland National Park
- Mount Frankland North National Park
- Mount Frankland South National Park
- Mount Lindesay National Park
- Mount Roe National Park
- Mount Shadforth Nature Reserve
- Owingup Nature Reserve
- Quarram Nature Reserve
- Shannon National Park
- Walpole-Nornalup National Park
- William Bay National Park

== History ==
The concept of a Walpole Wilderness Area was first developed by Donna Selby and Cath Roberts on behalf of the South Coast Environment Group Inc., in 1998. During the height of the old growth logging debate, the Walpole Wilderness proposal sought to realise the region's potential for nature conservation by proposing the creation of a Regional Wilderness Park which expanded and linked existing parks and reserves into a single integrated conservation reserve.

The proposal extended the concept of conserving the Shannon River Basin across the Deep River and Frankland River systems.

This proposal was also unique as it sought to integrate the Walpole/Nornalup townships and farming districts into the Area. It proposed the development of a unique relationship between local residents, visitors and the surrounding natural areas. It would facilitate the development of a wide range of nature-based recreational activities and maximise opportunities for associated business development. Existing recreational and tourism infrastructure would be enhanced and expanded to capitalise on the significant growth in tourism to the Walpole region, while concurrently ensuring the long term ecological and economic sustainability of the region.

The Walpole Wilderness area was adopted by the Western Australian Labor government by Premier Geoff Gallop on 22 April 2001.

== Values ==
These areas have long been recognised for their unique natural, cultural, scenic and landscape values, in particular the rich array of endemic and nationally significant flora and fauna. The planning area is important for:

- wilderness qualities;
- old-growth forests;
- outstanding and complex mosaic of landscapes (including heathlands, wetlands, and granite outcrops)
- location within an internationally recognised "biodiversity hotspot";
- many rivers that originate within and pass through the area, including the Deep, Weld, Walpole, Frankland, Bow, Kent, Styx, Denmark, Mitchell and Hay rivers;
- range of recreation and tourism opportunities from wilderness hiking through to world class facilities such as the Tree Top Walk; and
- rich indigenous and non-indigenous cultural heritage.
