= Acacia leptophleba =

Scientific classification
- Kingdom: Plantae
- Clade: Tracheophytes
- Clade: Angiosperms
- Clade: Eudicots
- Clade: Rosids
- Order: Fabales
- Family: Fabaceae
- Subfamily: Caesalpinioideae
- Clade: Mimosoid clade
- Genus: Acacia
- Species: A. leptophleba

Binomial name
- Acacia leptophleba F.Muell. ex Benth.
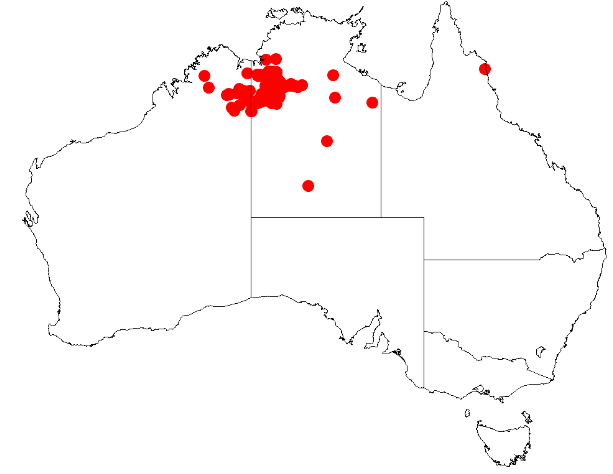
- Occurrence data from AVH

Synonyms
- Racosperma leptophlebum (F.Muell. ex Benth.) Pedley

Species of legume

Acacia leptophleba is a species of flowering plant in the family Fabaceae and is endemic to northern Australia. It is a rounded shrub with more or less smooth or slightly rough, grey bark, narrowly elliptic to narrowly lance-shaped, leathery rigid phyllodes, spikes of golden yellow flowers and erect, linear, woody, striated, glabrous pods.

== Description ==
Acacia leptophleba is a rounded, scurfy, resinous shrub that typically grows to a height of 0.5–2 m (1 ft 8 in – 6 ft 7 in) and has more or less smooth or slightly rough, grey bark and are light to dark brown branchlets. Its phyllodes are narrowly elliptic to narrowly lance-shaped with the narrower end towards the base, 35–110 mm (1.4–4.3 in) long, 7–20 mm (0.28–0.79 in) wide, wavy with resinous margins, rigid and leathery. The flowers are golden yellow and borne in spikes 20–45 mm (0.79–1.77 in) long. Flowering occurs from February to September, and the pods are erected, liear to lance-shaped and straight-sided, 70–115 mm (2.8–4.5 in) long and 6–9.5 mm (0.24–0.37 in) wide, woody, striated and glabrous with prominent margins. The seeds are oblong, 68 mm (2.7 in) long and black or dark brown with a narrow conical aril.

== Taxonomy ==
Acacia leptophleba was first formally described in 1864 by George Bentham in his Flora Australiensis from an unpublished description by Ferdinand von Mueller . The specific epithet (leptophleba) means 'thin or slender veined'.

== Distribution and habitat ==
This species of wattle grows in sandy or rocky soils on limy sandstone, dolomite or graphite on hillsides in woodland or on plains in grassland in northern Australia, mainly in the Ord and Bow River districts and at Sturt Creek in the Kimberley region of Western Australia, and from the Victoria River (Northern Territory) and eastwards to Montejinni Station and Wave Hill in the Northern Territory.

== Conservation status ==
Acacia leptophleba is listed as 'not threatened' by the Government of Western Australia Department of Biodiversity, Conservation and Attractions, and as 'least concern' under the Northern Territory Government Territory Parks and Wildlife Conservation Act.

== See also ==
- List of Acacia species
