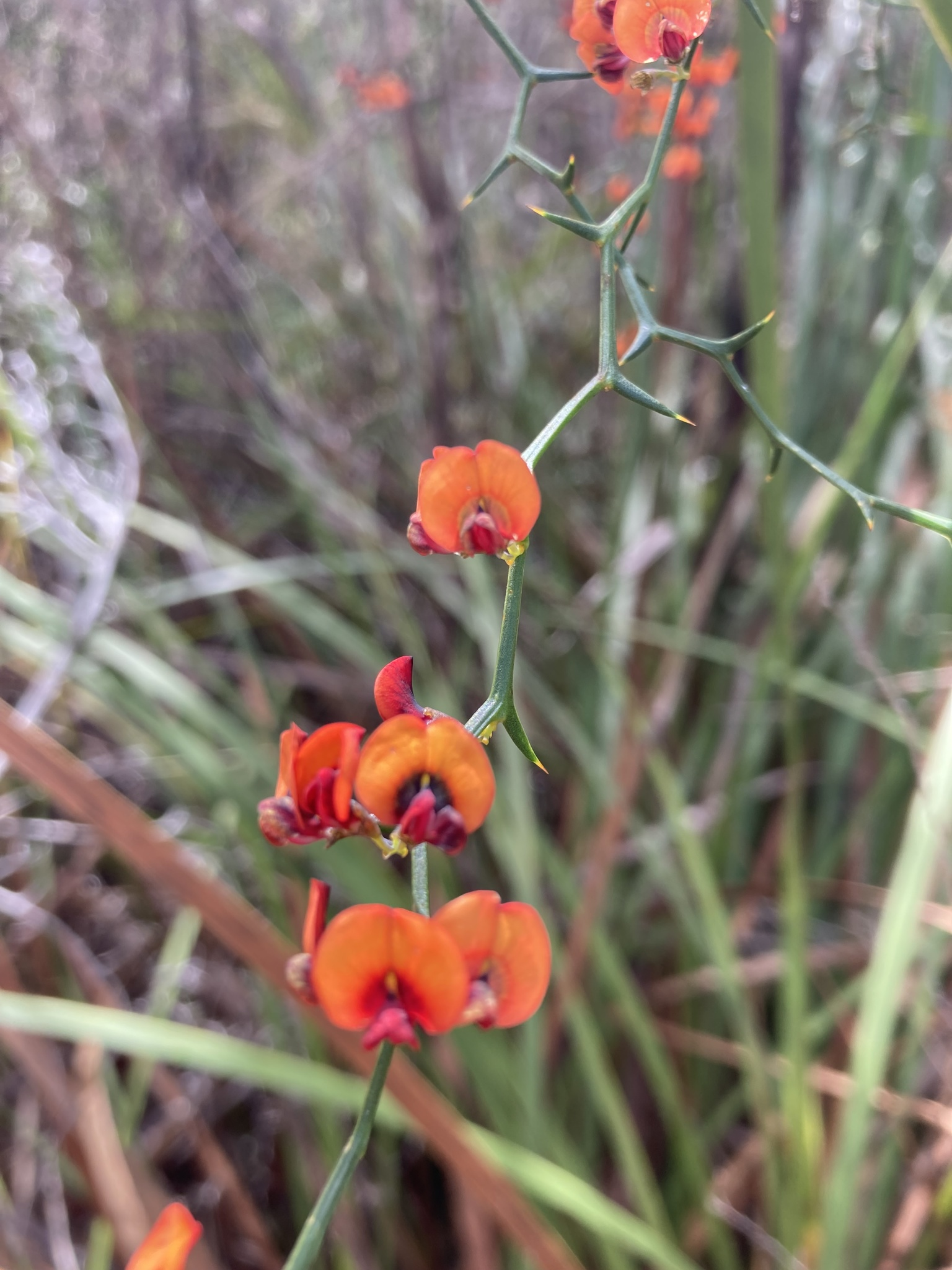
- In Mount Frankland National Park

Scientific classification
- Kingdom: Plantae
- Clade: Tracheophytes
- Clade: Angiosperms
- Clade: Eudicots
- Clade: Rosids
- Order: Fabales
- Family: Fabaceae
- Subfamily: Faboideae
- Genus: Daviesia
- Species: D. flexuosa

Binomial name
- Daviesia flexuosa Benth.

= Daviesia flexuosa =

Species of legume

Daviesia flexuosa is a species of flowering plant in the family Fabaceae and is endemic to the south-west coast of Western Australia. It is a glabrous, spreading shrub with zig-zagged branchlets, scattered, sharply-pointed, narrowly triangular phyllodes and yellow and red flowers.

== Description ==
Daviesia flexuosa is a glabrous, spreading shrub that typically grows to a height of up to 2.5 m (8 ft 2 in) and has zig-zagged branchlets with a phyllode at each bend. The phyllodes are sharply pointed, 5–43 mm (0.20–1.69 in) long and 1–2 mm (0.039–0.079 in) wide at the base. The flowers are arranged in groups of two to four in leaf axils on a peduncle 1–2 mm (0.039–0.079 in) long, the rachis up to 1 mm (0.039 in), each flower on a pedicel 1.5–3.0 mm (0.059–0.118 in) long with oblong bracts about 1 mm (0.039 in) long. The sepals are 3–4 mm (0.12–0.16 in) long and joined at the base, the upper two lobes joined for most of their length, the lower three about 0.25 mm (0.0098 in) long and triangular. The standard petal is broadly egg-shaped, 7.5–9.0 mm (0.30–0.35 in) long, 7–9 mm (0.28–0.35 in) wide and yellow with a broad red base, the wings 6.0–6.5 mm (0.24–0.26 in) long and red, and the keel 5.0–5.5 mm (0.20–0.22 in) long and red. Flowering occurs from July to September and the fruit is a flattened triangular pod 17–22 mm (0.67–0.87 in) long.

== Taxonomy ==
Daviesia flexuosa was first formally described in 1837 by George Bentham in Stephan Endlicher's Enumeratio plantarum quas in Novae Hollandiae ora austro-occidentali ad fluvium Cygnorum et in sinu Regis Georgii collegit Carolus Liber Baro de Hügel. The specific epithet (flexuosa) means "zig-zag", referring to the stem.

== Distribution and habitat ==
This species of pea grows in open forest and heathland, near the coast of southern Western Australia between Cape Naturaliste and Mount Manypeaks.

== Conservation status ==
Daviesia flexuosa is listed as "not threatened" by the Department of Biodiversity, Conservation and Attractions.
