= Boyndaminup National Park =

National park in Western Australia

- IUCN category II (national park)
- Location within Western Australia
- Boyndaminup National Park (●) is located in the Shire of Manjimup in the South West region
- Location: Shire of Manjimup, South West region, Western Australia, Australia
- Coordinates: 34°27′54″S 116°34′7″E
- Area: 54.43 km^{2} (21.02 sq mi)
- Designation: National park
- Designated: 2004
- Governing body: Parks and Wildlife Service of the Department of Biodiversity, Conservation and Attractions

Boyndaminup National Park is a national park in Western Australia. It is located in the Shire of Manjimup in the South West region. It was designated in 2004, and covers an area of 54.43 square kilometres (21.02 sq mi).

== Geography ==
The park lies west of Lake Muir. It consists of two separate areas, with the smaller portion lying southwest of the main portion. The park is mostly surrounded by state forest lands, and both areas adjoin Shannon National Park on the west.

== Flora and fauna ==
The park straddles two bioregions – the Jarrah Forest bioregion, also known as the Southwest Australia woodlands, in the north, and the Warren bioregion, also known as the Jarra-Karri forest and shrublands, to the south. The park contains areas of old-growth forest.

== Conservation ==
The park was proposed in Western Australia's Forest Management Plan 2004-2013 as part of a strategy to better protect old-growth forests. It was created by the Reserves (National Parks, Conservation Parks, and Nature Reserves) Bill 2004, which redesignated state forest lands to create the new national park. It is part of the Walpole Wilderness Area, which was designated in the same year, and encompasses several other national parks and reserves to the south and east.
