= Pterostylis jacksonii =

Southwest granite snail orchid

Scientific classification
- Kingdom: Plantae
- Clade: Tracheophytes
- Clade: Angiosperms
- Clade: Monocots
- Order: Asparagales
- Family: Orchidaceae
- Subfamily: Orchidoideae
- Tribe: Cranichideae
- Genus: Pterostylis
- Species: P. jacksonii

Binomial name
- Pterostylis jacksonii D.L.Jones & C.J.French

Species of orchid

Pterostylis jacksonii, commonly known as the southwest granite snail orchid, is a species of orchid endemic to the south-west of Western Australia. Both flowering and non-flowering plants have a rosette of leaves flat on the ground and flowering plants have a single green and white flower. It is only known from between Walpole and Albany.

== Description ==
Pterostylis jacksonii is a terrestrial, perennial, deciduous, herb with an underground tuber and a compact rosette of leaves 15–35 mm (0.6–1 in) in diameter. Flowering plants have a single green and white flower 9–11 mm (0.35–0.43 in) long and 5–8 mm (0.2–0.3 in) wide on a flowering stem 40–80 mm (2–3 in) high, sometimes with a light brown tinge. There is a single stem leaf 6–8 mm (0.2–0.3 in) long and 3–4 mm (0.1–0.2 in) wide on the flowering stem. The dorsal sepal and petals are fused, forming a slightly inflated hood or "galea" over the column. The lateral sepals are held close to the galea, almost closing the front of the flower and have erect, thread-like tips 14–17 mm (0.6–0.7 in) long. The labellum is broad but not visible from outside the flower. Flowering occurs in June and July.

== Taxonomy and naming ==
Pterostylis jacksonii was first formally described in 2014 by David Jones and Christopher French from a specimen collected in the Mount Frankland National Park and the description was published in Australian Orchid Review. The species had previously been known as Pterostylis sp. 'granite'. The specific epithet (jacksonii) honours William Pownall Jackson, who discovered this species.

== Distribution and habitat ==
The southwest granite snail orchid grows with moss on granite outcrops between Walpole and Albany in the Warren biogeographic region.

== Conservation ==
Pterostylis echinulata is classified as "not threatened" by the Western Australian Government Department of Parks and Wildlife.
