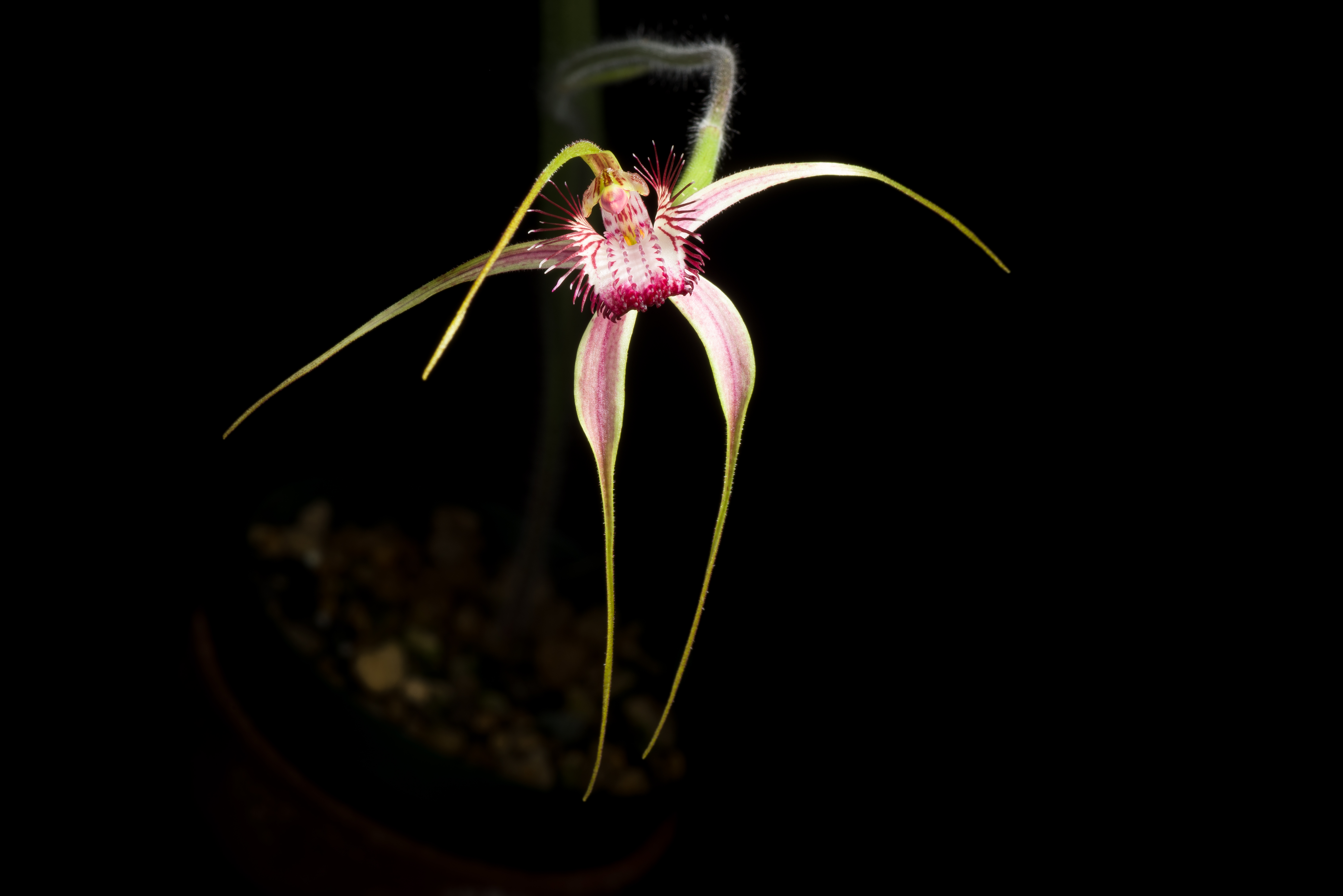

Scientific classification
- Kingdom: Plantae
- Clade: Embryophytes
- Clade: Tracheophytes
- Clade: Spermatophytes
- Clade: Angiosperms
- Clade: Monocots
- Order: Asparagales
- Family: Orchidaceae
- Subfamily: Orchidoideae
- Tribe: Diurideae
- Genus: Caladenia
- Species: C. serotina

Binomial name
- Caladenia serotina Hopper & A.P.Br.

Synonyms
- Arachnorchis serotina (Hopper & A.P.Br.) D.L.Jones & M.A.Clem.

= Caladenia serotina =

Christmas spider orchid

Species of orchid

Caladenia serotina, commonly known as the Christmas spider orchid, is a species of orchid endemic to the south-west of Western Australia. It has a single erect, hairy leaf and up to three white to cream-coloured and red flowers, although the relative amount of each is variable. It is one of the later-flowering spider orchids and occurs in the far south-west corner of the state.

== Description ==
Caladenia serotina is a terrestrial, perennial, deciduous, herb with an underground tuber and a single erect, hairy leaf, 100–200 mm (4–8 in) long and 4–20 mm (0.2–0.8 in) wide. Up to three flowers 80–120 mm (3–5 in) long, 80–100 mm (3–4 in) wide are borne on a stalk 250–600 mm (10–20 in) tall. The flowers have varying amounts of red and white or cream colours. The sepals and petals have long, thick, yellowish tips. The dorsal sepal is erect, 55–100 mm (2–4 in) long and 3–6 mm (0.1–0.2 in) wide and the lateral sepals have similar dimensions but spread widely and curve stiffly downwards near the tips. The petals are 45–80 mm (2–3 in) long and 2–4 mm (0.08–0.2 in) wide and arranged like the lateral sepals. The labellum is 16–30 mm (0.6–1 in) long, 10–14 mm (0.4–0.6 in) wide and white but with narrow red teeth up to 7 mm (0.3 in) long on the sides. The tip of the labellum is curled under and there are between four and eight rows of red, cream or white calli along the mid-line of the labellum. Flowering occurs from October to early January but is more prolific after fire the previous summer.

== Taxonomy and naming ==
Caladenia serotina was first formally described in 1992 by Stephen Hopper and Andrew Phillip Brown in Orchids of South-West Australia from a specimen collected near Manjimup but the description was not validly published. The description was validated by the same authors in a 2002 edition of Nuytsia. The specific epithet (serotina) is a Latin word meaning "happening late" referring to the late flowering of this orchid.

== Distribution and habitat ==
The Christmas spider orchid is found between Perth and Bremer Bay in the Esperance Plains, Jarrah Forest, Swan Coastal Plain and Warren biogeographic regions where it grows in winter-wet areas, sometimes flowering in shallow water.

== Conservation ==
Caladenia serotina is classified as "not threatened" by the Western Australian Government Department of Parks and Wildlife.
