= Mount Frankland North National Park =

National park in Western Australia

- IUCN category II (national park)
- Interactive map of Mount Frankland North National Park
- Location: South West region, Western Australia, Australia
- Coordinates: 34°39′S 116°42′E
- Area: 220.69 km^{2} (85.21 sq mi)
- Designation: National park
- Designated: 2004
- Administrator: Parks and Wildlife Service of the Department of Biodiversity, Conservation and Attractions

Mount Frankland North National Park is a national park in the South West region of Western Australia. It was designated in 2004, and covers an area of 220.69 km^{2}. It is part of the larger Walpole Wilderness Area that was established in the same year.

It is bounded on the east by Mount Roe National Park, and south and west by Mount Frankland National Park. It adjoins Lake Muir National Park to the north.

It is in the Jarrah Forest bioregion, also known as the Southwest Australia woodlands.
