= Kent River =

River in Western Australia

Coordinates: 34°59′34″S 116°59′29″E

Location
- Country: Australia

Physical characteristics
- Source
  - location: Tenterden
  - elevation: 295 metres (968 ft)
- Mouth
  - location: Irwin Inlet
  - elevation: sea level
- Length: 140 km (87 mi)

The Kent River is a river in the Great Southern region of Western Australia.

The headwaters of the river rise near Tenterden. The river flows in a south-westerly direction, crosses the Muir Highway east of Rocky Gully, flows through Mount Roe and Mount Lindesay national parks, crosses the South Coast Highway near Kenton, flows through the Owingup Nature Reserve swampland and finally discharges into the eastern side of Irwin Inlet.

There are two tributaries to the Kent: Styx River and Nile Creek.

The river was named in 1829 by Thomas Wilson, the first European to explore the river. He named it after a member of his exploration party John Kent, of the 39th Regiment, Assistant Commissary General at the King George Sound garrison.
