= Mount Roe National Park =

National park in Western Australia

- IUCN category II (national park)
- Interactive map of Mount Roe National Park
- Location: Great Southern region, Western Australia, Australia
- Coordinates: 34°46′S 116°56′E
- Area: 1,278 km^{2} (493 sq mi)
- Designation: National park
- Designated: 2004
- Administrator: Parks and Wildlife Service of the Department of Biodiversity, Conservation and Attractions

Mount Roe National Park is a national park in the Great Southern region of Western Australia. It was designated in 2004, and covers an area of 1278 km^{2}.

== Geography ==
The park covers an area of 1277.26 km^{2}. It is bounded on the north west by Lake Muir National Park, on the west by Mount Frankland North and Mount Frankland National Parks, on the south west by Mount Frankland South National Park, and on the south east by Mount Lindesay National Park.

Mount Roe (357 m) is a large granite outcrop near the western edge of the park. It was named in 1829 by Thomas Braidwood Wilson after John Septimus Roe, the first Surveyor General of Western Australia.

The Frankland River flows from north to south through the eastern portion of the park. The Kent River flows through the central portion of the park.

== Flora and fauna ==
Plant communities in the park include old-growth jarrah (Eucalyptus marginata) forests, shrublands and heath, and wetlands.

It straddles two ecoregions – the Jarrah-Karri forest and shrublands cover the southern portion of the park and extend to the coast, and Southwest Australia woodlands cover the central and northern portions of the park.

== Conservation ==
The park is part of the Walpole Wilderness Area. It is managed to protect its wilderness values and there are no recreation sites within the park.
