= Irwin Inlet =

Inlet on south coast of Western Australia

- Interactive map of Irwin Inlet
- Coordinates: 34°58′23″S 116°58′28″E
- Country: Australia
- State: Western Australia
- LGA: Shire of Denmark

Irwin Inlet is an inlet in the located on the Great Southern region of Western Australia.

It was also known as Quarram Inlet. The inlet receives water from two main sources, Bow River of the north west and Kent River to the north east. The inlet itself discharges into the Southern Ocean via Foul Bay.

The inlet is approximately 20 kilometres (12 mi) east of Walpole and 30 kilometres (19 mi) west of Denmark. The South Coast Highway is about 3 kilometres (2 mi) north of the inlet.

A sandbar across the entrance to the inlet on the ocean side, but this is often breached during the winter. The inlet bisects Peaceful Bay beach.

The inlet is a wave dominated estuary with a total area of 13 square kilometres (5 sq mi); it is estimated that 30% of the catchment is cleared.

The inlet is slowly turning into swampland as a result of its high sediment loading and shallow depth. The basin supports large seagrass meadows and is used as a commercial fishery.

The Bibbulmun Track crosses Irwin Inlet, and canoes are provided in sheds on either side of the track for hikers to make the crossing with. The channel is 150 metres (492 ft) wide at the point where it must be crossed.
