= Leioproctus douglasiellus =

Scientific classification
- Kingdom: Animalia
- Phylum: Arthropoda
- Clade: Pancrustacea
- Class: Insecta
- Order: Hymenoptera
- Family: Colletidae
- Genus: Leioproctus
- Species: L. douglasiellus

Binomial name
- Leioproctus douglasiellus Michener, 1965

Species of bee

Leioproctus douglasiellus, or Leioproctus (Andrenopsis) douglasiellus, is a species of bee in the family Colletidae and subfamily Colletinae. It is endemic to Australia. It was described by American entomologist Charles Duncan Michener in 1965.

== Etymology ==
The specific epithet douglasiellus honours Athol Douglas for his efforts in collecting the bees of Western Australia.

== Description ==
Female body length 8 mm, wing length almost 5 mm. Integumental colouration mainly black, hair white to brownish.

== Distribution and habitat ==
The species occurs in south-west Western Australia. The type locality is Pearce.

== Behaviour ==
The adults are flying mellivores.
