= Mount Frankland South National Park =

National park in Western Australia

- IUCN category II (national park)
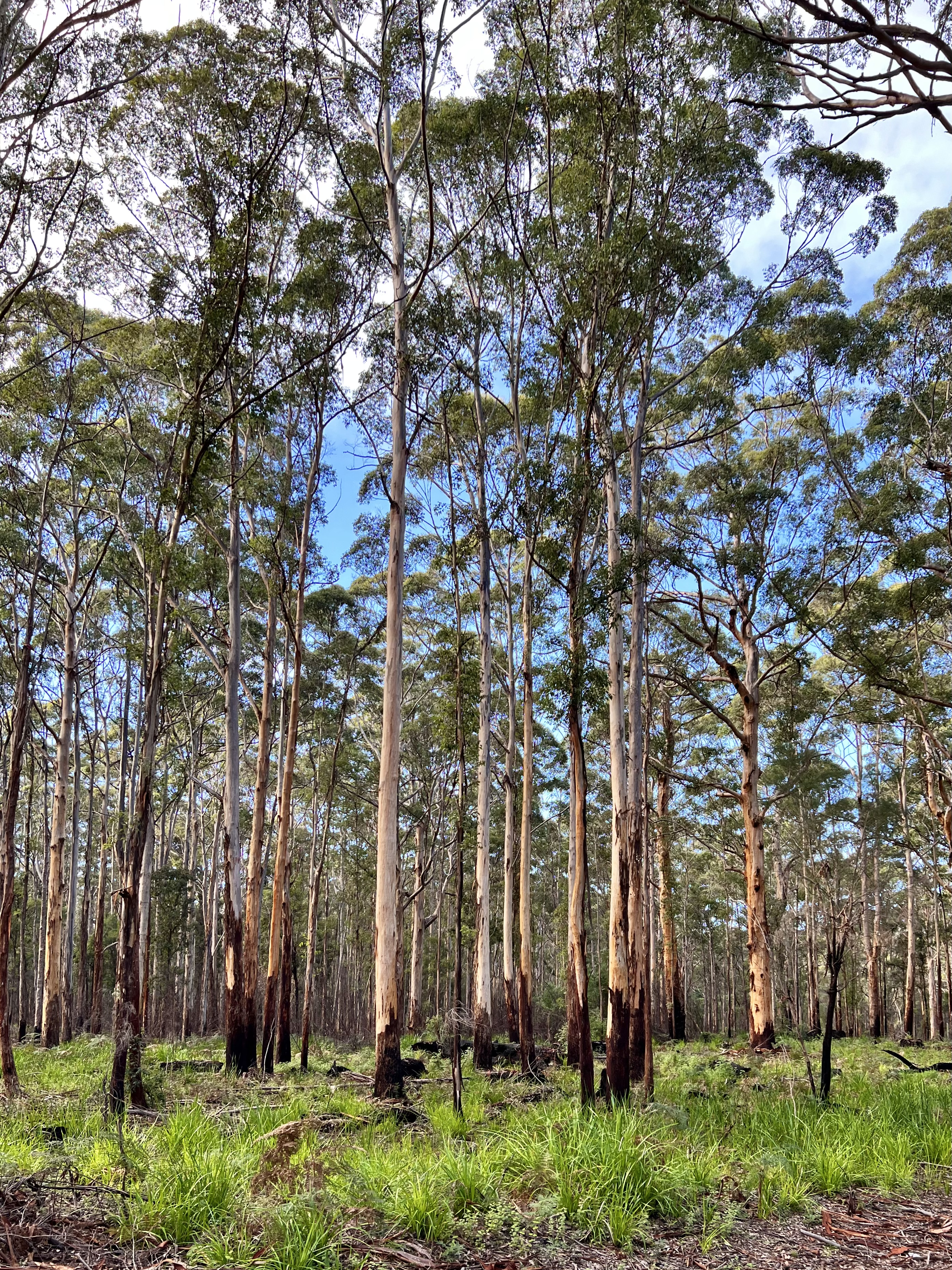
- Mount Frankland South National Park
- Interactive map of Mount Frankland South National Park
- Location: South West and Great Southern regions, Western Australia, Australia
- Coordinates: 34°52′S 116°37′E
- Area: 422.99 km^{2} (163.32 sq mi)
- Designation: National park
- Designated: 2004
- Administrator: Parks and Wildlife Service of the Department of Biodiversity, Conservation and Attractions

Mount Frankland South National Park is a national park in Western Australia. It lies mostly in the South West region, with the eastern portion in Great Southern region. It was designated in 2004, and covers an area of 422.99 km^{2}. It is part of the larger Walpole Wilderness Area that was established in the same year.

It adjoins Mount Frankland National Park to the north and northeast, and Mount Roe National Park to the east. It is bounded by D'Entrecasteaux National Park on the west. Walpole-Nornalup National Park adjoins it to the south.

It is in the Warren bioregion, also known as the Jarrah-Karri forest and shrublands.
