= Bow River (Western Australia) =

River in Western Australia

Location
- Country: Australia
- State: Western Australia
- Shire: Denmark

Physical characteristics
- Source
  - location: near Mount Frankland National Park
  - coordinates: 34.83984°S 116.93787°E
  - elevation: 110 m (360 ft)
- Mouth: Irwin Inlet
  - location: near Walpole-Nornalup National Park
  - coordinates: 34.98941°S 116.95470°E
- Length: 22 km (14 mi)
- Basin size: 119 km^{2} (46 mi^{2})

The Bow River is a river in the Great Southern region of Western Australia.

The river rises on the eastern edge of the Frankland State Forest and flows in a southerly direction discharging into Irwin Inlet, which opens to the Southern Ocean at Foul Bay.

Bow River is a fresh water river with potential to be used as a water source in the area.

The hamlet of Bow Bridge, once a timber milling and farming settlement, is located where the South Coast Highway crosses Bow River, about 25 kilometres (16 mi) east of Walpole.

Forms of environmental damage have been identified at the river and its wetlands, including:

- Exotic weed infestation from Watsonia, blackberry and exotic grasses
- Feral animals such as pigs and foxes
- Water pollution from excess fertiliser loads added by local agricultural activity
- Pathogens such as Phytophthora

The Bow River is listed on the Shire of Denmark's heritage register. It is significant for the local indigenous people.
