= Lake Muir National Park =

- IUCN category II (national park)
- Location within Western Australia
- Location: Western Australia
- Nearest city: Manjimup
- Coordinates: 34.446°S 116.68°E
- Area: 96.36 km^{2} (37.20 sq mi)
- Established: 2004
- Governing body: Parks and Wildlife Service
- Website: Official website

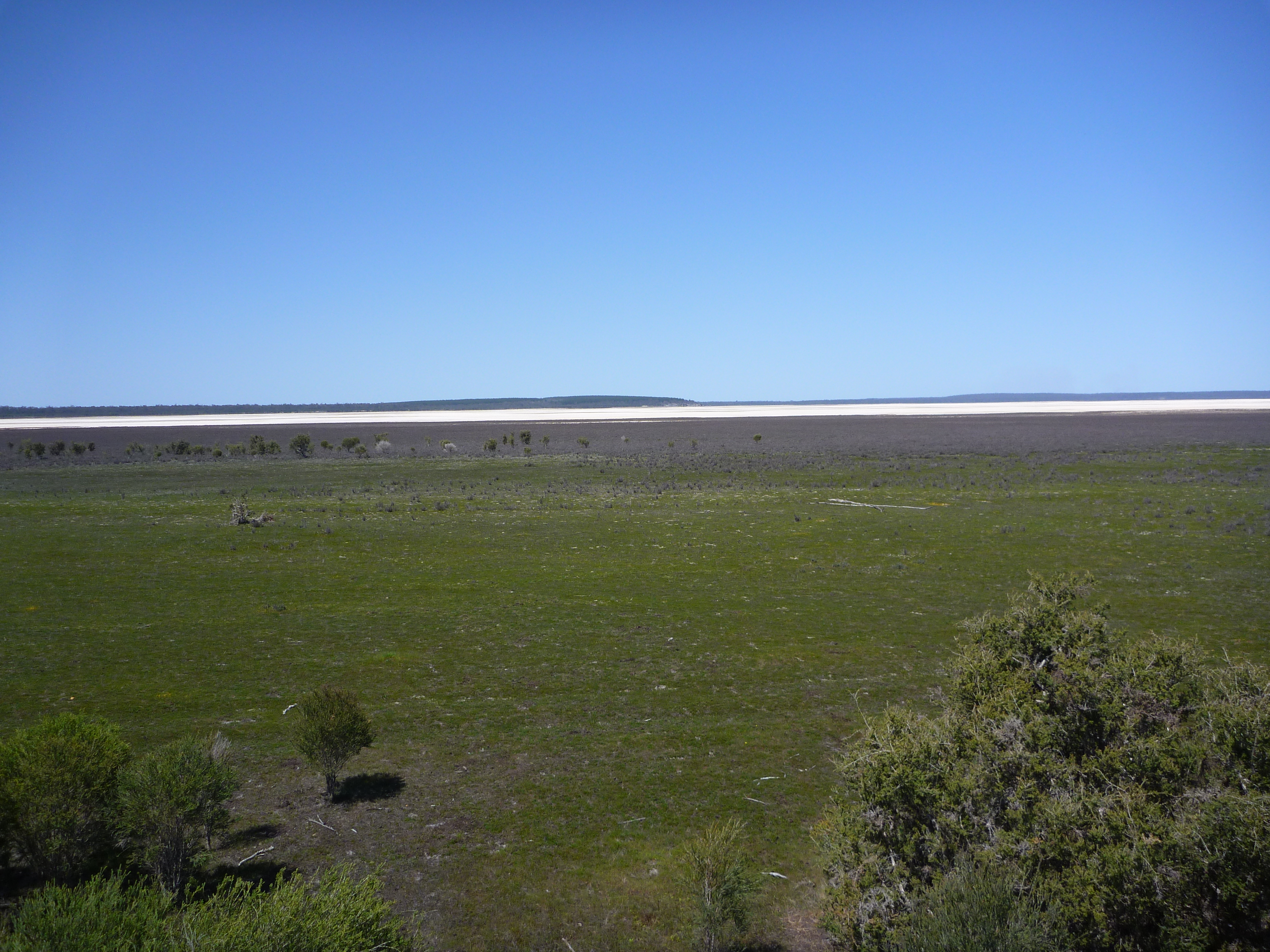

Lake Muir National Park is a national park in Western Australia, located 290 kilometres (180 mi) south east of Perth to the south of Muir Highway in the Shire of Manjimup.

Lake Muir and the Muir-Byenup System, a complex of lakes and wetlands, are located in Lake Muir Nature Reserve, which adjoins the park to the north. The Muir-Byenup system is a designated wetland of international importance under the Ramsar Convention. The lake and wetlands are part of the Warren River catchment.

Lake Muir National Park adjoins Mount Roe National Park to the east and south east, and Mount Frankland North National Park to the south.

== See also ==
- List of protected areas of Western Australia
