= Owingup Swamp and Boat Harbour Wetlands Important Bird Area =

Important Bird Area in Western Australia

Coordinates: 35°00′17″S 117°04′32″E

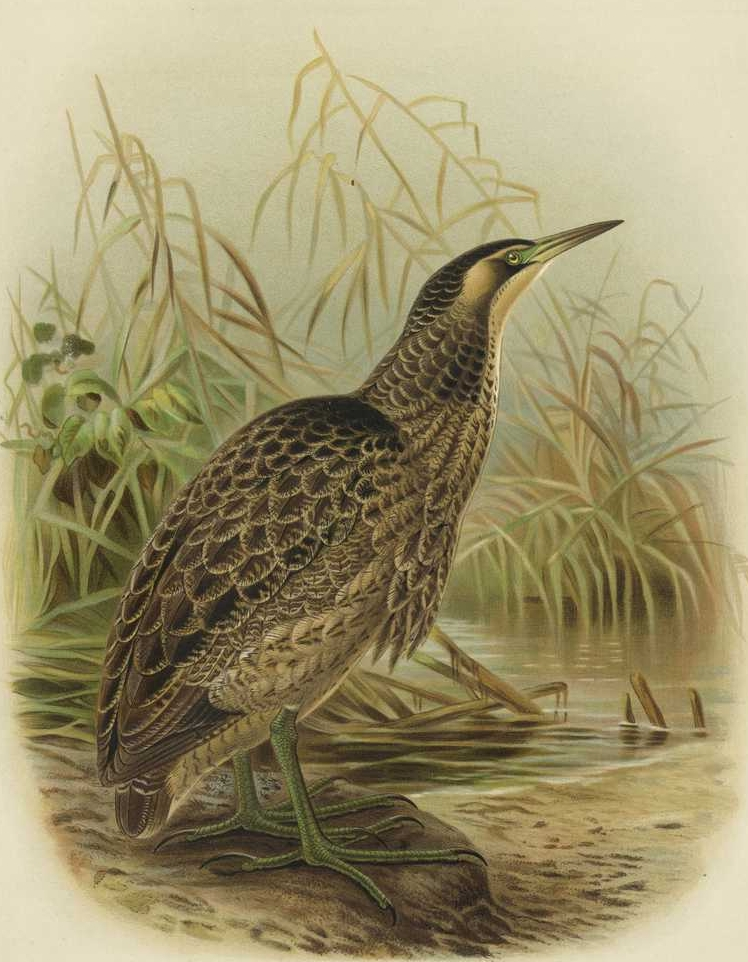
The IBA is an important site for Australasian bitterns

The Owingup Swamp and Boat Harbour Wetlands Important Bird Area is a 442-hectare (1,090-acre) site comprising Owingup Swamp, and ten other, smaller, wetlands nearby, in the Great Southern region of south-western Australia. It lies about 25 kilometres (16 mi) south-southwest of Denmark, Western Australia, near the track to the coast at Boat Harbour cove. The site has been identified by BirdLife International as an Important Bird Area (IBA) because it is supports small numbers of the endangered Australasian bittern.

== Description ==
The shallow wetlands are permanent or near-permanent, cycling through seasonal changes in salinity from freshwater in winter and spring to brackish in summer and autumn. They provide habitat for the bitterns in the form of sedgelands dominated by Baumea articulata or Gahnia trifida, but also have heathland, shrubland and forest communities. The site is largely contained by the Owingup Nature Reserve and has a Mediterranean climate with wet winters and dry summers.

== Flora and fauna ==
Over fifty species of plants, over forty species of macroinvertebrates, and at least eight species of fish have been recorded in the area. The swamp supports the largest remaining mature stand of juniper myrtle (Taxandria juniperina) forest and a nearby wetland holds one of the largest known populations of the nationally threatened tall donkey orchid, Diuris drummondii. The swamp system is a nursery area for freshwater and estuarine fishes.

=== Birds ===
With the bitterns, some forty waterbird species have been recorded at the swamp, with another five in the surrounding wetlands. Of these, ten species breed in the area, including blue-billed ducks. Long-toed stints and Eurasian coots are known to use the swamp. Other birds include western rosellas, western thornbills, red-winged fairywrens, western spinebills and red-eared firetails.
