= Mount Frankland National Park =

National park in Australia

- IUCN category II (national park)
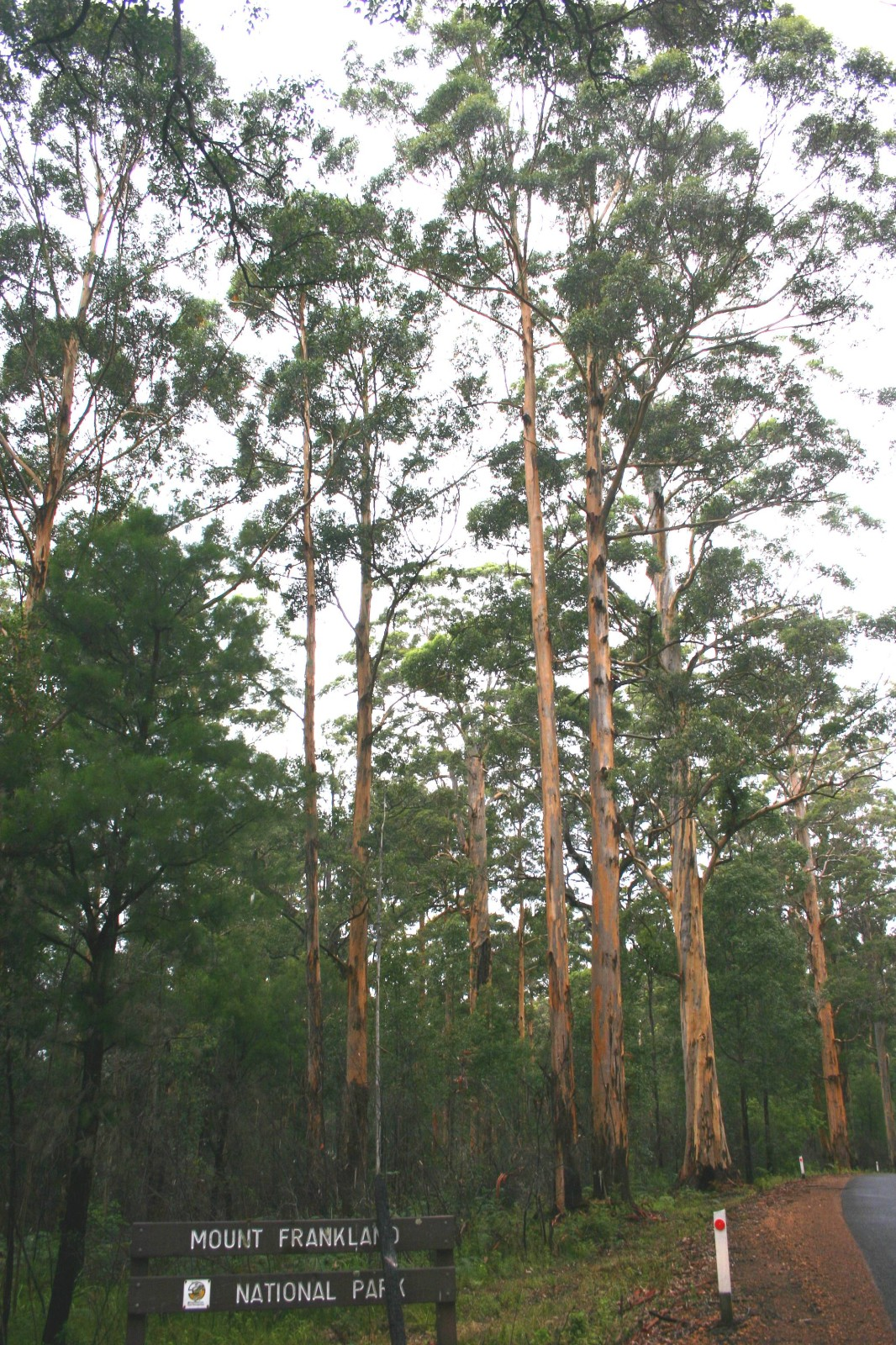
- Mount Frankland National Park

- Location within Western Australia
- Location: Western Australia
- Nearest city: Walpole
- Coordinates: 34°45′59″S 116°44′34″E
- Area: 373.59 km^{2} (144.24 sq mi)
- Established: 1988
- Governing body: Department of Environment and Conservation
- Website: Official website

Mount Frankland National Park is a national park in the South West region of Western Australia, 327 km (203 mi) south of Perth. The park is part of the larger Walpole Wilderness Area that was established in 2004, an international biodiversity hotspot.

== Geography ==
It covers an area of 371.22 square kilometres in the low granite hills to the north of the town of Walpole.

Mount Frankland (411 metres), known as Caldyanup to the aboriginal inhabitants, is a granite peak which offers panoramic views across the landscape. There is a fire lookout atop the mountain. The mountain was named in 1829 by Thomas Braidwood Wilson after George Frankland, who was then Surveyor General of Tasmania.

The park extends from northwest to southeast. It is bounded on the north by Mount Frankland North National Park, on the east by Mount Roe National Park, on the south by Mount Frankland South National Park, and on the west by Shannon National Park.

== Climate ==
Annual rainfall at Walpole is around 1,200 mm (47 in). On the 422-metre high peak of Mount Frankland, though no rain gauge has ever been installed, annual rainfall is probably around 1,500 mm (59 in). Most rain falls between May and August, but unlike drier parts of southwestern Australia, showers are not infrequent even during the summer.

== Flora and fauna ==
The park is covered largely by forests of karri (Eucalyptus diversicolor) and red tingle (Eucalyptus jacksonii), two of the world's largest trees. The three tingle species are unique to the area between the park and the coast and the only eucalypts to be buttressed, a feature which reflects the moist conditions prevailing within the park.

Low heathland is the dominant vegetation on the thin soil over the park's many granite outcrops.

== Recreation ==
There are several walking trails in the park, ranging from wheelchair-accessible to difficult.

An unsealed road, usable by conventional vehicles, provides auto access to a car park within the park. There are picnic areas with gas barbecues and toilets 100 metres from the car park, and a treetop-level wilderness lookout further on.

== See also ==
- Protected areas of Western Australia
