= Shannon National Park =

National park in Western Australia

- IUCN category II (national park)
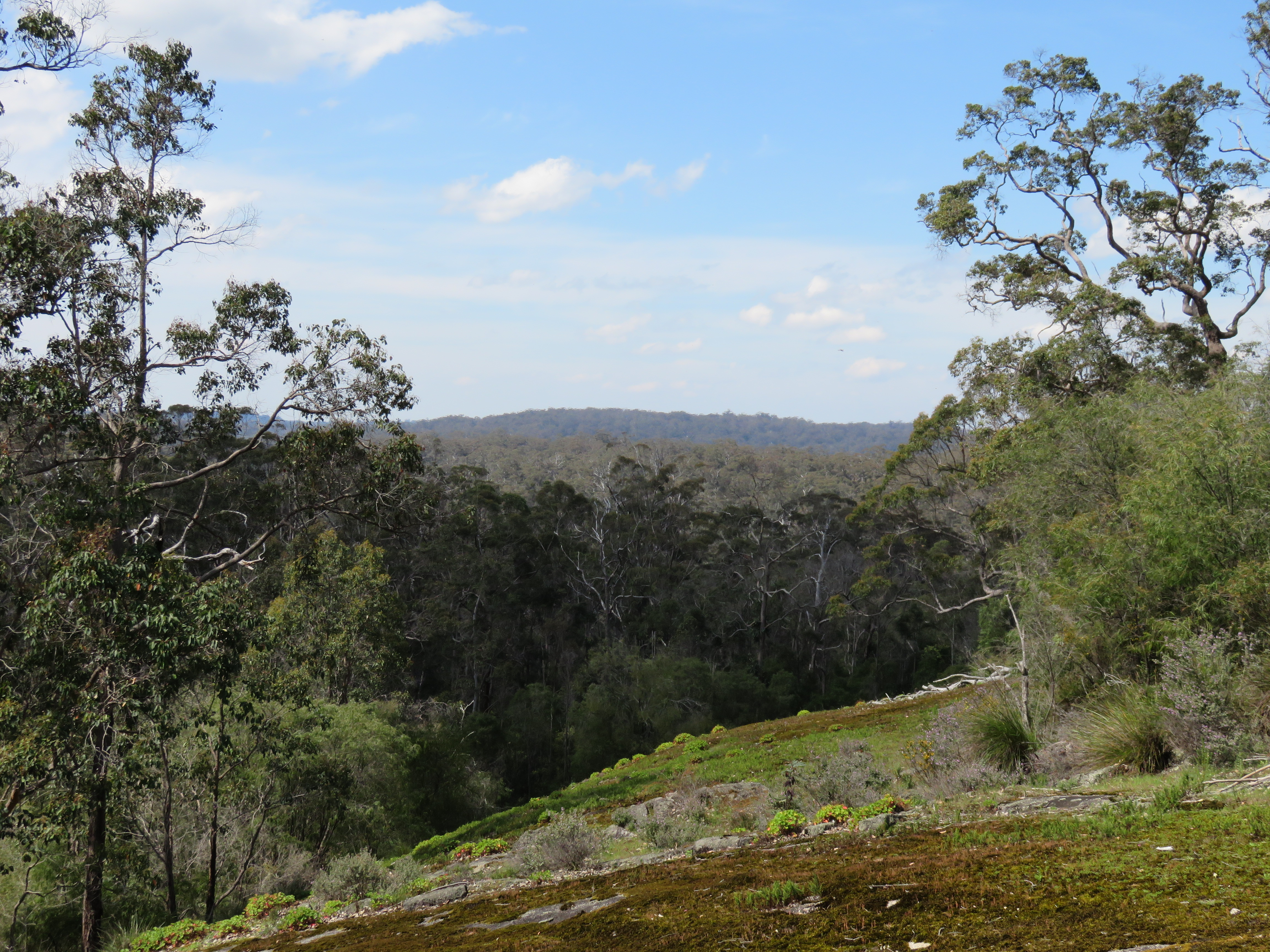
- Mokare's Rock from the Rock Walktrail at Shannon National Park

- Location within Western Australia
- Location: Western Australia
- Nearest city: Pemberton
- Coordinates: 34°36′11″S 116°21′54″E
- Area: 525.98 km^{2} (203.08 sq mi)
- Established: 1988
- Governing body: Department of Parks and Wildlife
- Website: Official website

Shannon National Park is a national park on the south coast of Western Australia, 302 km (188 mi) south of Perth and 55 km (34 mi) southeast of Manjimup. It was declared a national park in 1988. The park covers the entire Shannon River basin. It is part of the larger Walpole Wilderness Area that was established in 2004, an international biodiversity hotspot.

The area contains biologically rich wetlands and heathlands as well as old growth and regrowth karri forests. The area remained largely untouched by logging until the 1940s due to the inaccessibility of the area. A timber mill and the town of Shannon were established in the mid-1940s as a result of a timber shortage during World War II. The town once boasted over 90 homes and a hall, post office, church and nursing station. A dam was built in 1949 to guarantee water supply during the summer months.

The mill eventually closed in 1968 and the houses were sold and moved, leaving the townsite empty and a campground now stands were the town once did. The area was gazetted as a national park in 1988 and is now part of the Walpole Wilderness Area.

The campgrounds contain toilets, gas barbecues, hot water showers and two huts available to campers on a first come first served basis. Entry fees apply for the park.

A 48 km (30 mi) unsealed road called the Great Forest Trees Drive was completed in 1996 and provides tourists with the opportunity to view many of the features of the park. There are information stops, picnic areas and walks located along the drive.

== See also ==
- Protected areas of Western Australia
