= Mount Lindesay National Park =

National park in Western Australia

- IUCN category II (national park)
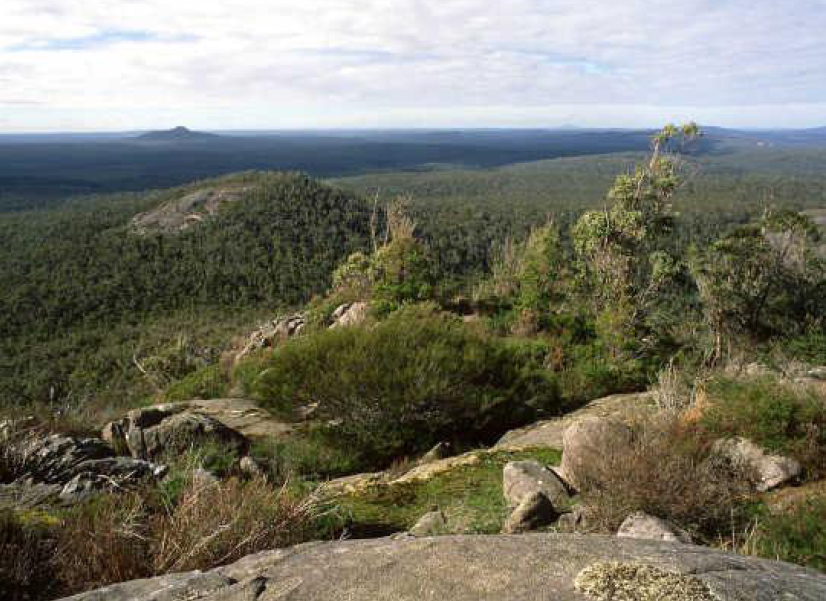
- View from Granite Peak towards Mount Roe
- Interactive map of Mount Lindesay National Park
- Location: Great Southern region, Western Australia, Australia
- Coordinates: 34°52′S 117°22′E
- Area: 395.73 km^{2} (152.79 sq mi)
- Designation: National park
- Designated: 2004
- Administrator: Parks and Wildlife Service of the Department of Biodiversity, Conservation and Attractions

Mount Lindesay National Park is a national park in the Great Southern region of Western Australia. It was designated in 2004, and covers an area of 395.73 km^{2}. It is part of the larger Walpole Wilderness Area that was established in the same year.

It is bounded on the north and north west by Mount Roe National Park.

It straddles two ecoregions – the Jarrah-Karri forest and shrublands cover the southern portion of the park and extend to the coast, and Southwest Australia woodlands cover the northern portion of the park.

The park is the easternmost in the Walpole Wilderness Area, which was designated in 2004 and includes several other national parks and reserves.
