= Tingle =

Tingle may refer to:

== People ==
- Henry Tingle Wilde (1872–1912), chief officer on the Titanic

=== Surname ===
- Aubrey Tingle, Canadian pediatrician
- Chuck Tingle, pseudonymous author of gay niche erotica
- Jack Tingle (1924–1958), American basketball player
- Jimmy Tingle (born 1955), American comedian
- John Tingle (1931–2022), Australian journalist and politician, father of Laura
- Laura Tingle (born 1961), Australian journalist
- Sam Tingle (1921–2008), Rhodesian racing driver
- Scott D. Tingle (born 1965), American NASA astronaut
- Tim Tingle, native American storyteller

=== Fictional characters ===
- Eve Tingle, the titular character from the black comedy film Teaching Mrs. Tingle
- Tingle (character), character in a series of Nintendo video games, Mainly from the video game series; The Legend Of Zelda

== Music ==
- "Tingle" (song), 1991 single by That Petrol Emotion from their album Chemicrazy
- Tingles (album), a 1990 album by Ratcat

== Other uses ==
- Red tingle, popular name for Eucalyptus jacksonii in Western Australia
- Rate's tingle, popular name for Eucalyptus brevistylis
- Yellow tingle, common name for Eucalyptus guilfoylei

== See also ==
- Tingle Creek Chase, a horserace
- Tingling sensation associated with paresthesia
- Tingly
- Tingler (disambiguation)
