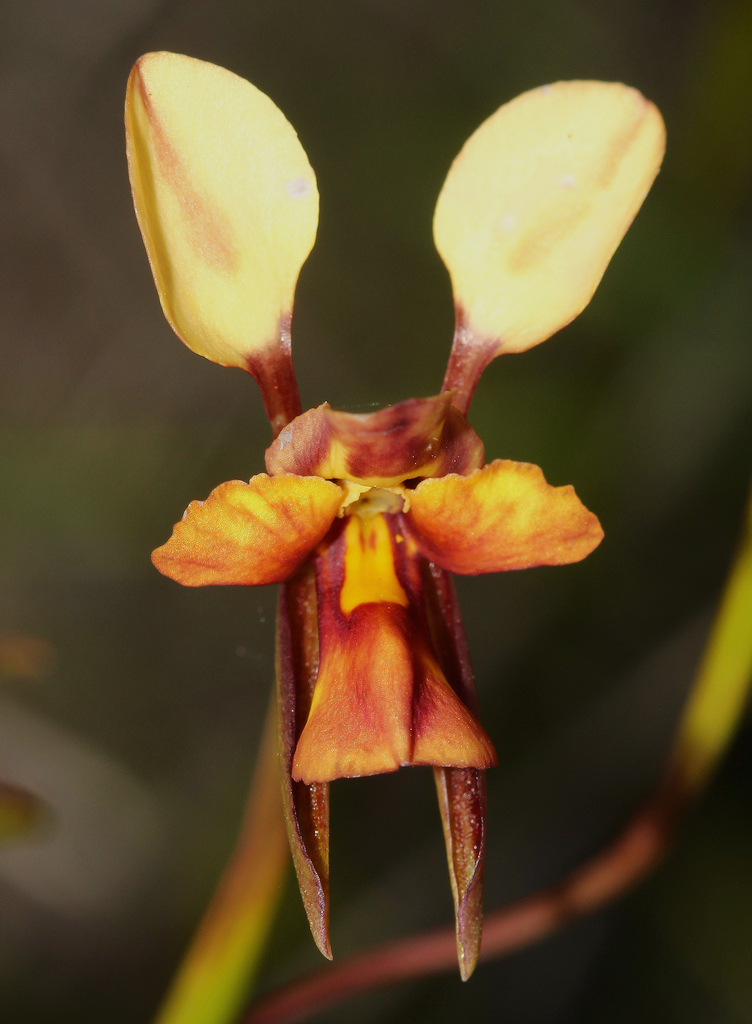
- Near Lake Muir

Scientific classification
- Kingdom: Plantae
- Clade: Tracheophytes
- Clade: Angiosperms
- Clade: Monocots
- Order: Asparagales
- Family: Orchidaceae
- Subfamily: Orchidoideae
- Tribe: Diurideae
- Genus: Diuris
- Species: D. insignis

Binomial name
- Diuris insignis D.L.Jones & C.J.French

= Diuris insignis =

Dark bee orchid

Species of orchid

Diuris insignis, commonly known as dark bee orchid, is a species of orchid that is endemic to the south-west of Western Australia. It has between two and six narrowly linear to thread-like leaves and up to five yellow flowers with many dark red markings.

== Description ==
Diuris insignis is a tuberous, perennial herb with between two and six narrowly linear to thread-like leaves 60–150 mm (2.4–5.9 in) long and 1–2 mm (0.039–0.079 in) wide. Up to five yellow flowers with dark red markings, 15–20 mm (0.59–0.79 in) long and wide are borne on a flowering stem 200–400 mm (7.9–15.7 in) tall. The dorsal sepal is narrowly egg-shaped to narrowly elliptic, 8–13 mm (0.31–0.51 in) long and 4.5–8.5 mm (0.18–0.33 in) wide. The lateral sepals are parallel or crossed near the tip, 9–14 mm (0.35–0.55 in) long, 1.5–3 mm (0.059–0.118 in) wide and project forwards. The petals are more or less erect or curved backwards and paddle-shaped, 6–10 mm (0.24–0.39 in) long and 5–9 mm (0.20–0.35 in) wide on a reddish-brown stalk 3–5 mm (0.12–0.20 in) long. The labellum is 7–11 mm (0.28–0.43 in) long with three lobes - the centre lobe broadly wedge-shaped, 7.0–10.5 mm (0.28–0.41 in) long and wide. The side lobes spread widely apart and are oblong, 5–7 mm (0.20–0.28 in) long and 2–4 mm (0.079–0.157 in) wide. There are two smooth, yellow calli ridges heavily marked with dark red near the mid-line of the labellum. Flowering occurs in October and early November.

== Taxonomy and naming ==
Diuris insignis was first formally described in 2013 by David Jones and Christopher J. French in Australian Orchid Review, from a specimen collected by Jones near Muir Highway, 17 km (11 mi) west of the Frankland River crossing in 1985. The specific epithet (insignis) means "remarkable" or "notable", in reference to the appearance of the flowers.

== Distribution and habitat ==
Dark bee orchid grows in moist grassland and sedgeland in winter-wet flats and around swamps between Mount Barker and Manjimup in the Jarrah Forest bioregion of south-western Western Australia.

== Conservation ==
Diuris insignis is listed as "not threatened" by the Western Australian Government Department of Biodiversity, Conservation and Attractions.
