= Tingler =

Tingler may refer to:

- Tingler (surname), multiple people
- The Tingler (film), a 1959 horror film starring Vincent Price
- Tingler (fictional character), a character from the stop motion film The Life and Adventures of Santa Claus (1985 film)
- "The Tingler", a 1991 song by the Future Sound of London from the Pulse 3 EP
- "The Tingler", a 1991 song by Severed Heads from the album Cuisine (With Piscatorial)
- "The Tingler", a 2003 song by Blondie from the album The Curse of Blondie
- The Tingler, a brand name for a head massager
- Project Tingler, a dating sim by Zoe Quinn and Chuck Tingle

== See also ==
- Tingling
- Tingly
- Tingle (disambiguation)
