= Tingley (disambiguation) =

Tingley may refer to:

== Places ==
- Tingley, West Yorkshire, England
- Tingley, Iowa, United States
- In Albuquerque, New Mexico, United States:
  - Tingley Beach, a recreational area
  - Tingley Coliseum, a multi-purpose arena
  - Tingley Field, a former baseball stadium
- RAF Tingley, a former Royal Air Force in Tunisia

== People ==
- Beulah Rebecca Hooks Hannah Tingley (1893–1986), American political activist
- Christopher Tingley, English academic
- Clyde Tingley (1881–1960), governor of New Mexico
- Connor Tingley (born 1993), American artist
- Katherine Tingley (1847–1929), American Theosophist, founder of Lomaland
- Leeann Tingley (born 1981), American beauty pageant titleholder and Miss Rhode Island USA 2006 also Top 10 Miss USA 2006
- Merle Tingley (1921–2017), Canadian cartoonist
- Paul Tingley (born 1970), Canadian sailor
- Ron Tingley (born 1959), Major League Baseball catcher
- Stephen Tingley (1839–1915), Canadian stagecoach driver
- Sue Tingley (born 1977), Canadian field hockey player
- Tyler Tingley, American educator

== See also ==
- Tingler (surname)
