= Weld River =

River in Western Australia

Weld
- Location of the mouth in Western Australia

Location
- Country: Australia
- State: Western Australia
- Region: South West

Physical characteristics
- Source: Mount Burnside
  - location: Lake Muir State Forest
  - elevation: 211 m (692 ft)
- Mouth: Deep River
  - coordinates: 34°49′31″S 116°34′59″E
  - elevation: 52 m (171 ft)
- Length: 37 km (23 mi)
- Basin size: 240 km^{2} (93 sq mi)

Basin features
- National park: Shannon National Park

The Weld River is a river in the South West region of Western Australia.

The river rises below Mount Burnside in the Lake Muir State forest. The river flows in a southerly direction through the Shannon National Park until it flows into the Deep River, of which it is a tributary.

The water quality of the river is excellent and is considered fresh.
