= Walpole River =

River in Western Australia

Coordinates: 34°58′48.21″S 116°42′42.04″E

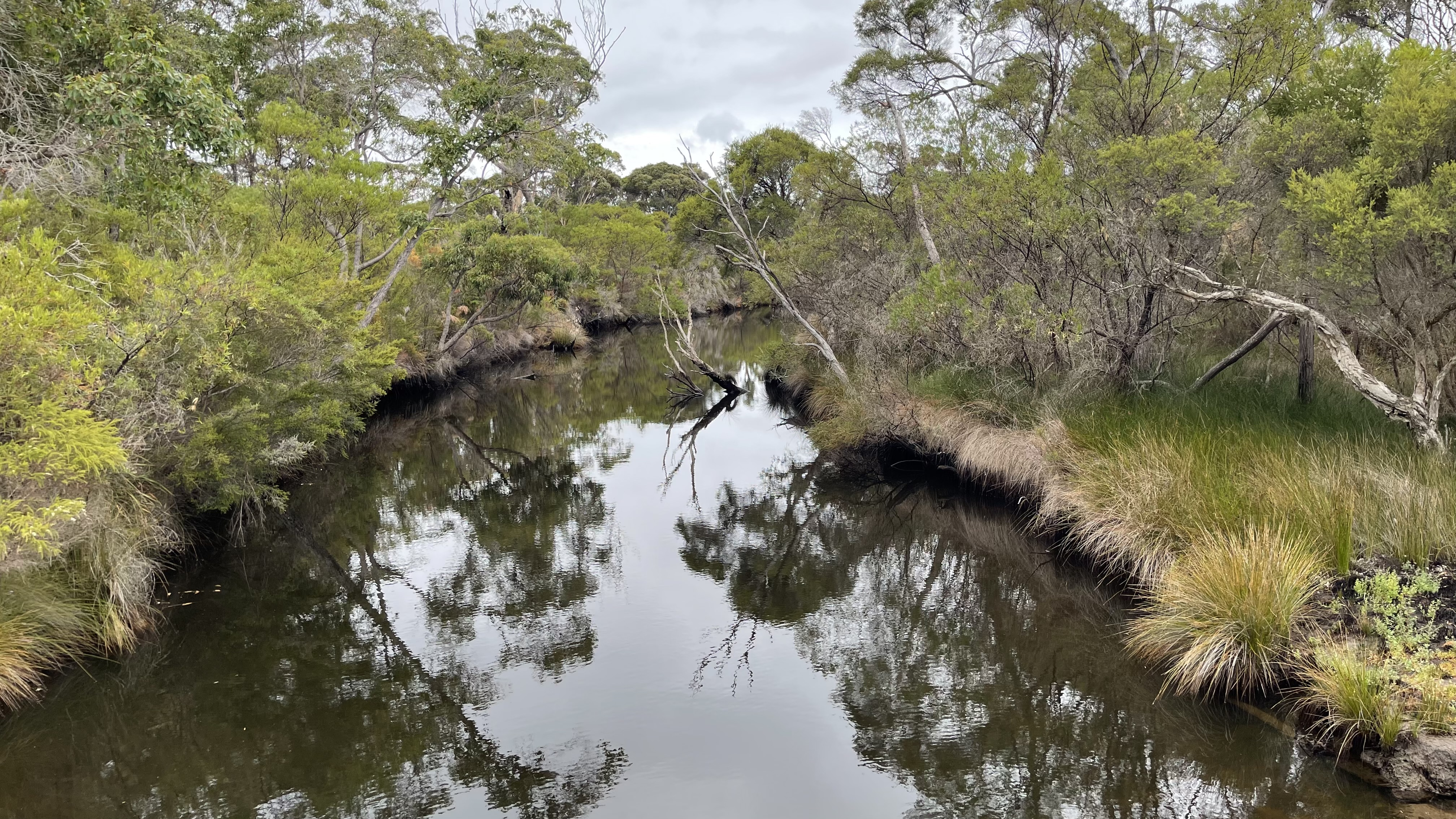
- Looking south down Walpole River from bridge carrying South Western Highway

Location
- Country: Australia

Physical characteristics
- Source
  - elevation: 99 metres (325 ft)
- Mouth
  - location: Walpole Inlet
- Length: 15 kilometres (9 mi)
- Basin size: 60 square kilometres (14,826 acres)

The Walpole River is a river in the Great Southern region of Western Australia. The river was seen by Captain Thomas Bannister in 1831 and named by Governor James Stirling after Captain W. Walpole.

The catchment of the Walpole River provides drinking water to the town of Walpole. It also feeds the Irwin and Nornalup Inlets. The water quality of the river is considered to be fresh.
