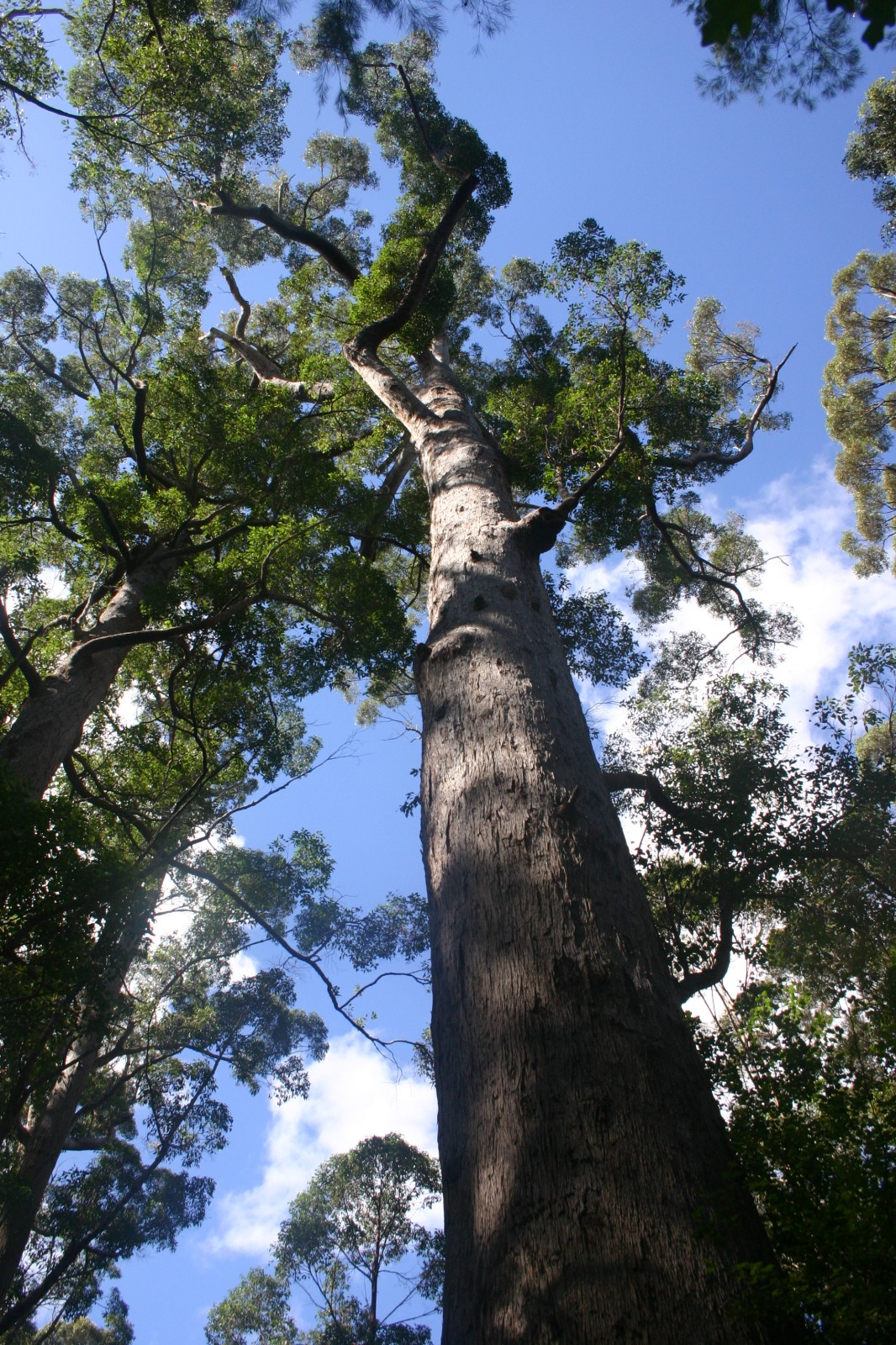
- Red tingle in the Valley of the Giants

Conservation status
- Near Threatened (IUCN 3.1)

Scientific classification
- Kingdom: Plantae
- Clade: Tracheophytes
- Clade: Angiosperms
- Clade: Eudicots
- Clade: Rosids
- Order: Myrtales
- Family: Myrtaceae
- Genus: Eucalyptus
- Species: E. jacksonii

Binomial name
- Eucalyptus jacksonii Maiden

= Eucalyptus jacksonii =

Red tingle

Species of eucalyptus

Eucalyptus jacksonii, commonly known as the red tingle, is a species of tall tree endemic to the southwest of Western Australia and is one of the tallest trees found in the state. It has thick, rough, stringy reddish bark from the base of the trunk to the thinnest branches, egg-shaped to lance-shaped adult leaves, flower buds in groups of seven, white flowers and shortened spherical to barrel-shaped fruit.

== Description ==
Eucalyptus jacksonii is a tree that typically grows to a height of 8 to 45 metres (26 to 148 ft) and has thick, rough, stringy and furrowed grey-brown or red-brown bark. The bases of very old, heavily buttressed trees can have a circumference up to 24 metres (79 ft). While some references estimate red tingle reach heights of up to 75 metres (246 ft), the tallest known living tree stands at 52 m (171 ft) tall. The crown is dense and compact, forming a heavy canopy. Young plants and coppice regrowth have broadly egg-shaped leaves that are dark green on the upper surface, paler below, 120–170 mm (4.7–6.7 in) long and 60–100 mm (2.4–3.9 in) wide. Adult leaves are arranged alternately, dark green on the upper surface, paler below, egg-shaped to lance-shaped, 60–95 mm (2.4–3.7 in) long and 12–25 mm (0.47–0.98 in) wide on a petiole 10–20 mm (0.39–0.79 in) long. The flower buds are arranged in leaf axils in groups of seven on an unbranched peduncle 8–12 mm (0.31–0.47 in) long, the individual buds on pedicels 4–6 mm (0.16–0.24 in) long. Mature buds are an elongated oval, 7–8 mm (0.28–0.31 in) long and 4–5 mm (0.16–0.20 in) wide with a conical operculum. Flowering occurs between January and March and the flowers are white. The fruit is a woody shortened spherical to barrel-shaped capsule 8–11 mm (0.31–0.43 in) long and 7–10 mm (0.28–0.39 in) wide on a pedicel 2–6 mm (0.079–0.236 in) long and with the valves enclosed below the level of the rim.

The trees often have shallow root systems and grow a buttressed base.

The heartwood is deep pink to reddish brown with a green-wood density of about 960 kg/m^{3} (1,620 lb/cu yd), and air-dried density about 770 kg/m^{3} (1,300 lb/cu yd).

One specimen, known as the "Giant Tingle Tree" is a tourist attraction in the Walpole-Nornalup National Park near Walpole. Its base has been hollowed by fire and it is claimed to have the largest girth of any living eucalypt.

The red tingle is often compared to the other two species - the yellow tingle (Eucalyptus guilfoylei) and Rate's tingle (Eucalyptus brevistylis) are smaller. The red tingle is more closely related to Rate's tingle, both of which belong to the subgenus Eucalyptus.

E. jacksonii typically live for 70 years. Both red tingle and Rate's tingle, Eucalyptus brevistylis can live for up to 400 years.

== Taxonomy and naming ==
The species was first described by the botanist Joseph Maiden in 1914 in the Journal and Proceedings of the Royal Society of New South Wales. Eucalyptus jacksonii is named after Sidney William Jackson, an Australian naturalist and ornithologist. Jackson collected the specimens used by Maiden near the "Deep River", Nornalup Inlet and "Bow River", Irwin's Inlet.

== Distribution and habitat ==
The distribution of the species has been shrinking due to climate change and land clearing. They are now found primarily in Walpole-Nornalup National Park and in a few isolated sites outside the park in the Walpole area at the juncture of the South West and Great Southern regions along the south coast of Western Australia where it grows on hillsides and in gullies in loamy soils.

The trees often occur with Eucalyptus marginata (jarrah) and Eucalyptus diversicolor (karri) and Corymbia calophylla (marri) trees. The red tingle also can occur with Eucalyptus guilfoylei (yellow tingle) and Eucalyptus brevistylis (Rate's tingle) and are the dominant species in the stands in which they occur.

== Ecology ==
Red Tingle is regarded as one of the six forest giants found in Western Australia; the other trees include; Corymbia calophylla (marri), Eucalyptus diversicolor (karri), Eucalyptus gomphocephala (tuart), Eucalyptus marginata (jarrah) and Eucalyptus patens (yarri).

The species is listed as near threatened according to the International Union for Conservation of Nature in 2019. The estimated number of mature individuals is 22200 to 42000. It has an estimated area of occupancy of 112 km^{2} (43 sq mi) an estimated extent of occurrence of 445 km^{2} (172 sq mi). The population is stable but is severely fragmented.

=== Gallery ===
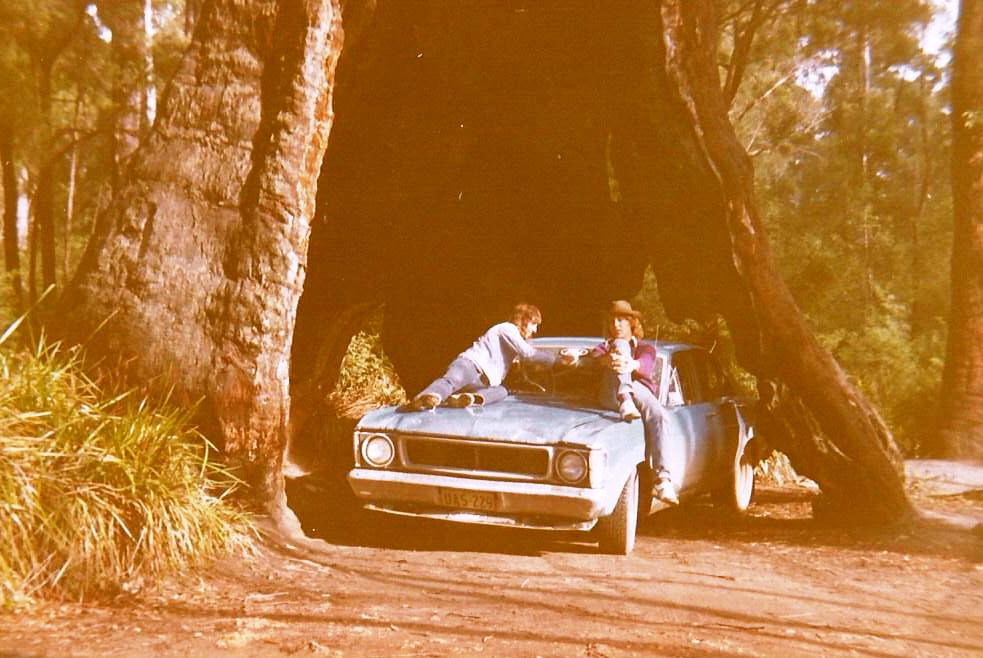
Valley of the Giants, Walpole May, 1977

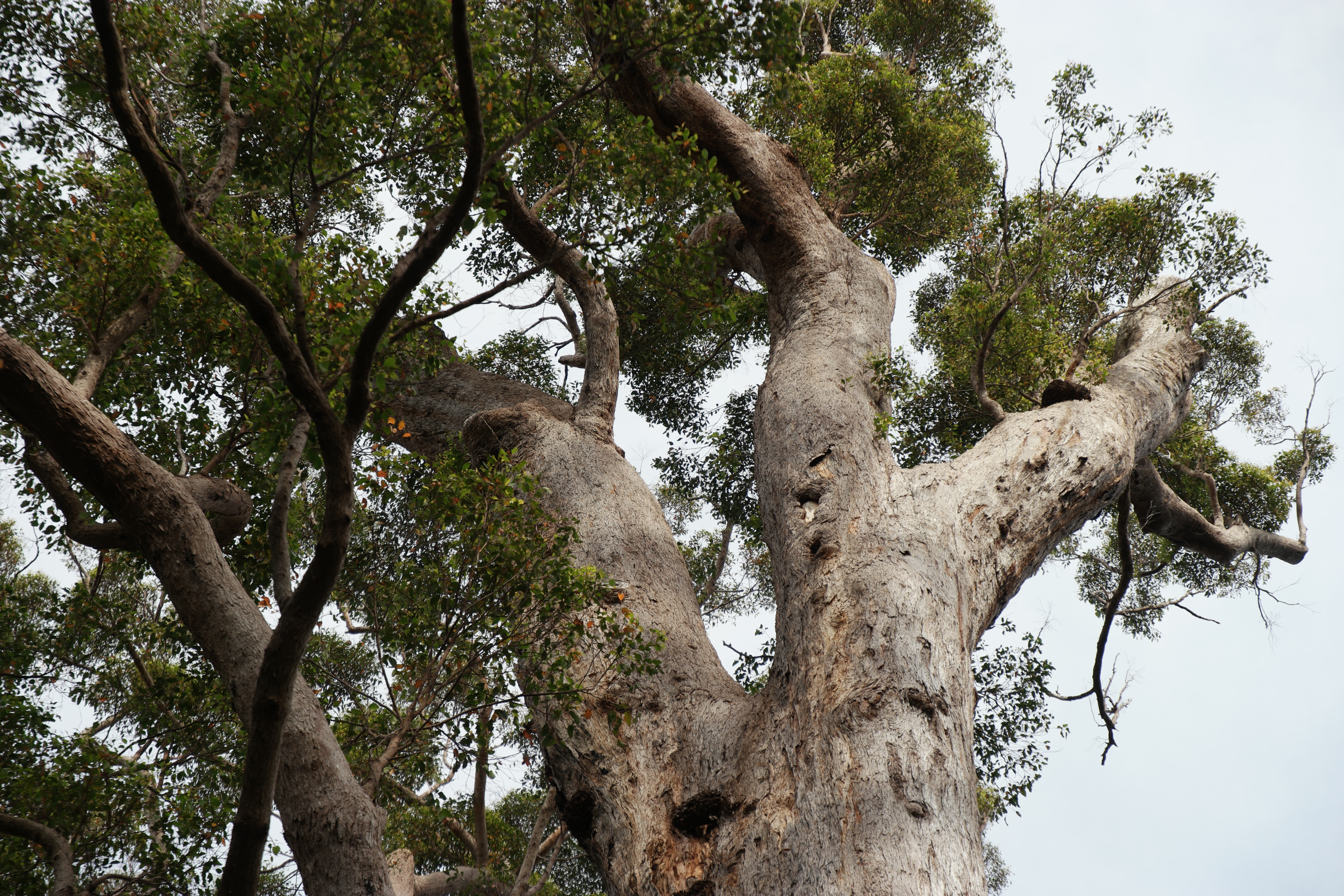
Tingle tree crown Walpole-Nornalup National Park

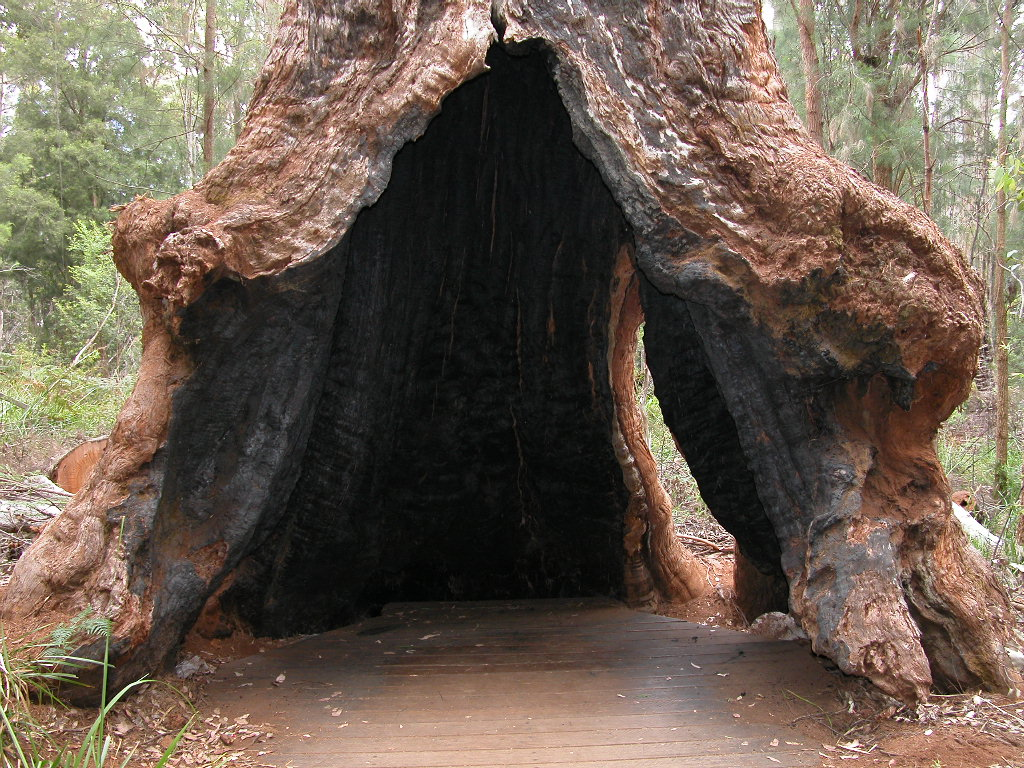
The buttressed and burnt base of a red tingle in the Valley of the Giants

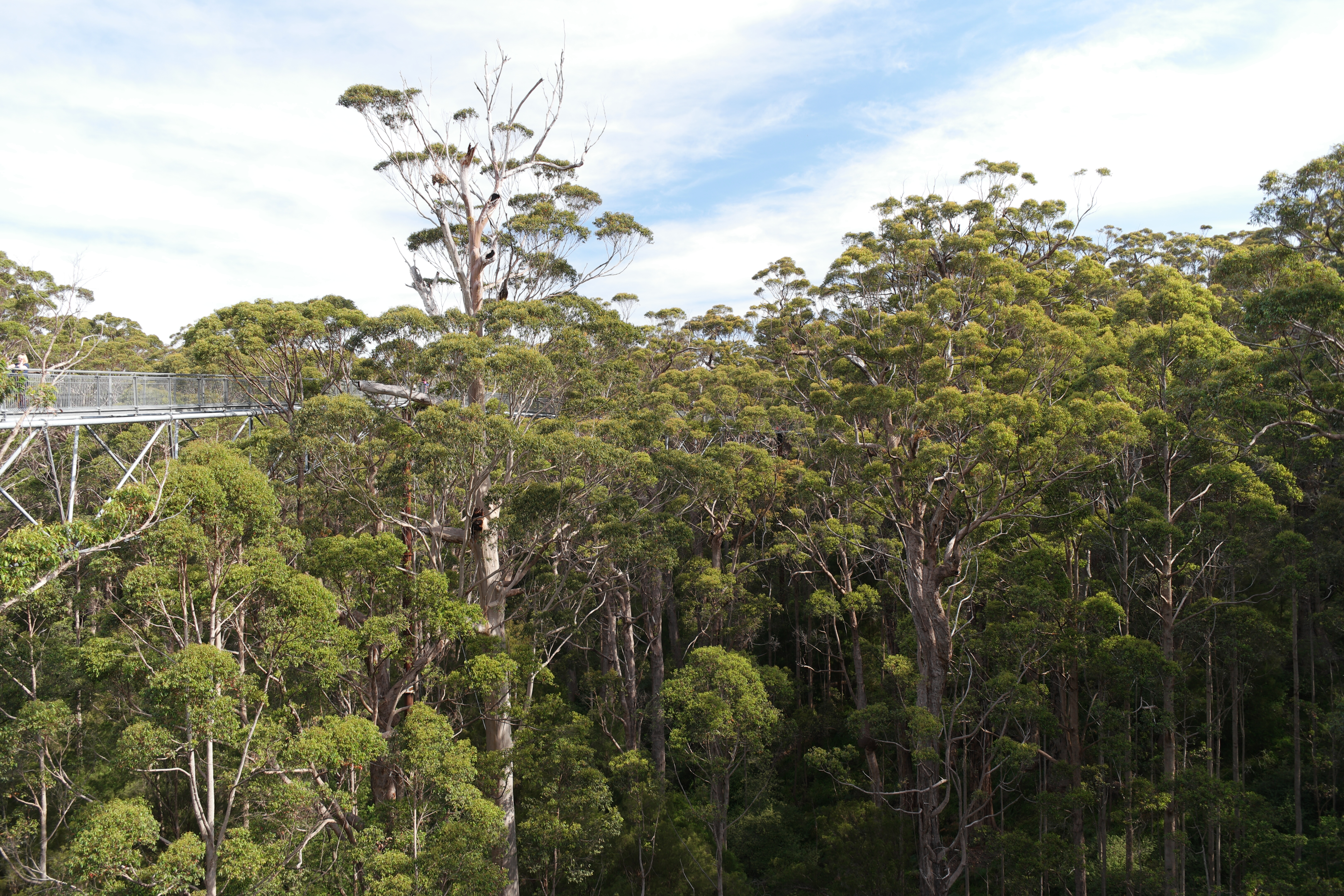
Valley of the Giants, Walpole Nornalup National Park containing tingle forest

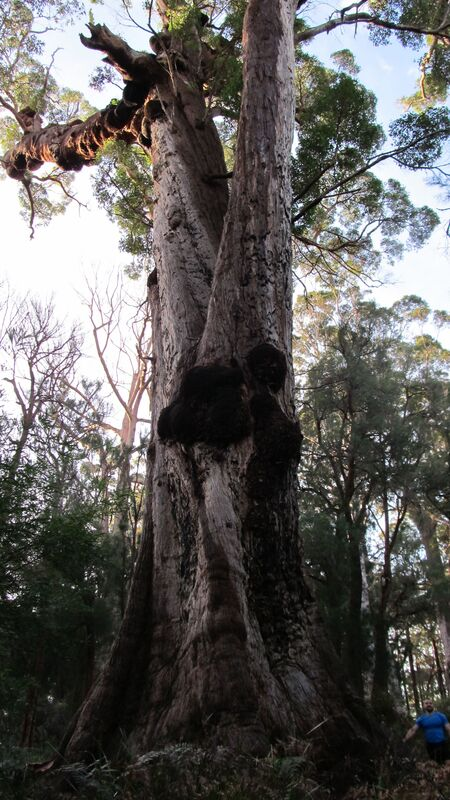
Old Rusty, the biggest red tingle in actual wood volume

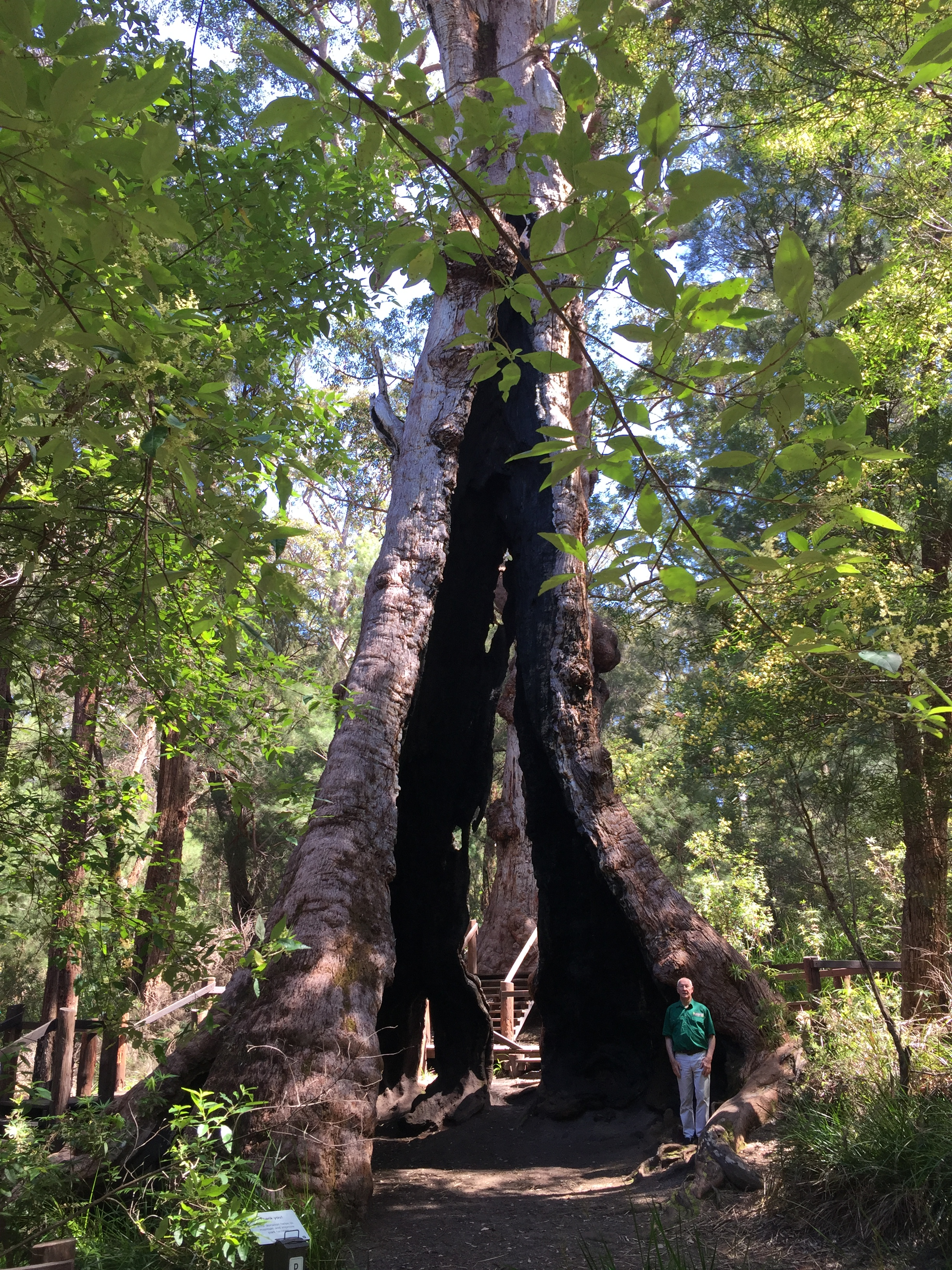
Hollow Trunk, the largest girthed red tingle and largest in restored volume

== See also ==
- List of Eucalyptus species
