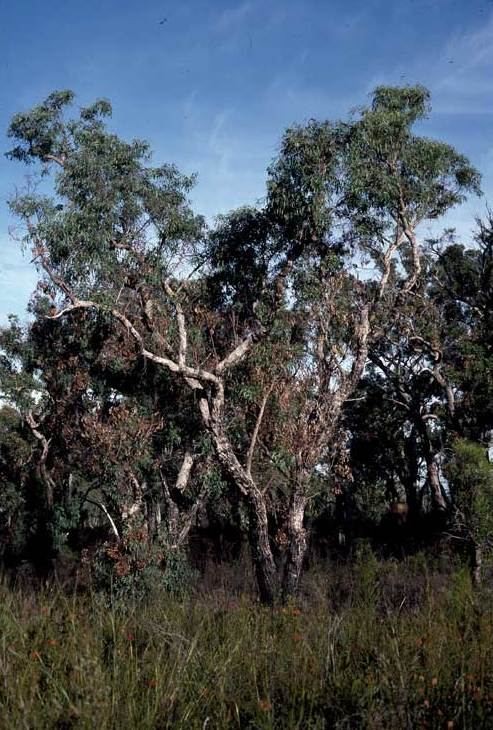
- At Walpole - Manjimup

Scientific classification
- Kingdom: Plantae
- Clade: Tracheophytes
- Clade: Angiosperms
- Clade: Eudicots
- Clade: Rosids
- Order: Myrtales
- Family: Myrtaceae
- Genus: Eucalyptus
- Species: E. patens

Binomial name
- Eucalyptus patens Benth.

= Eucalyptus patens =

Yarri

Species of eucalyptus endemic to Western Australia

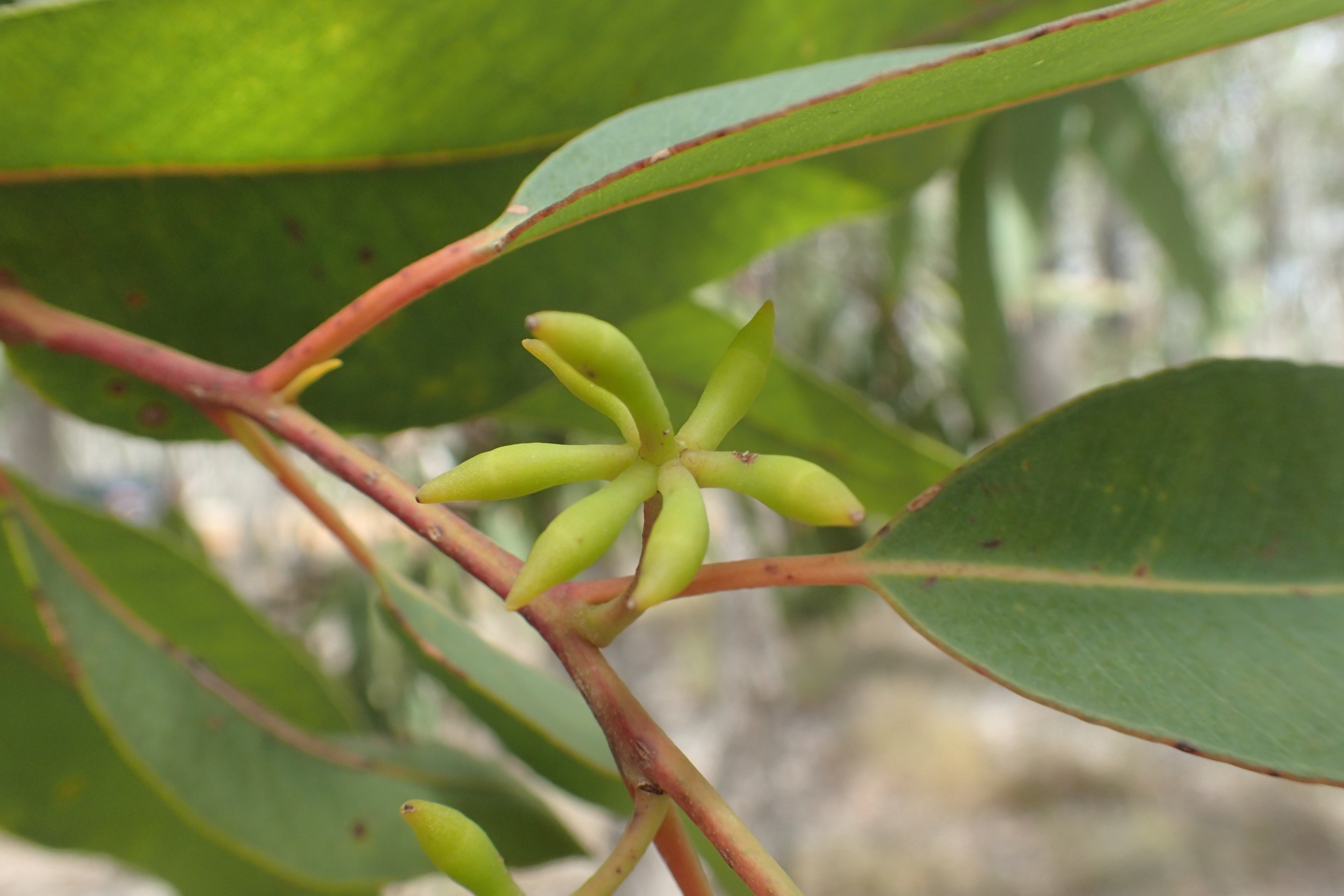
Flower buds

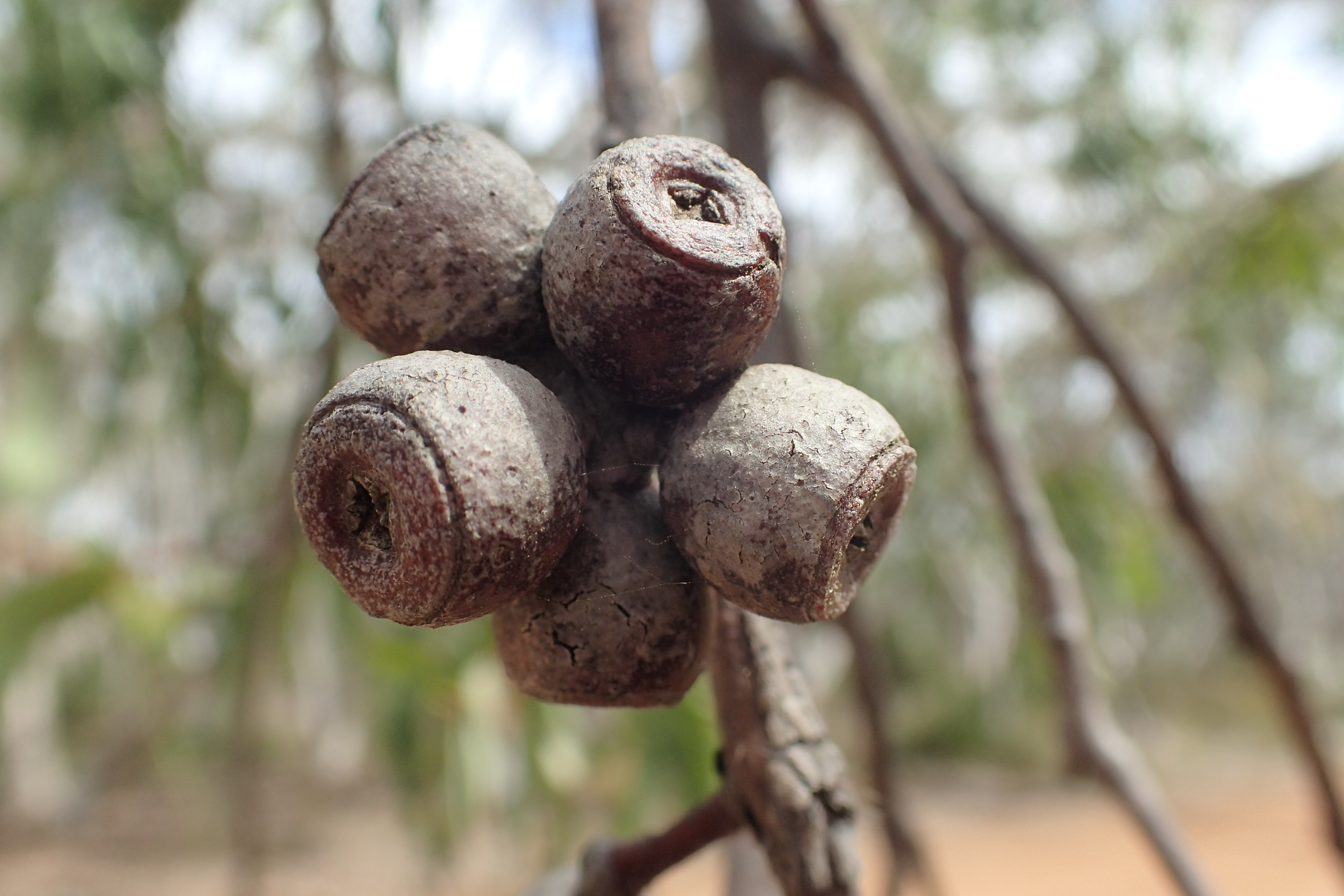
Fruit

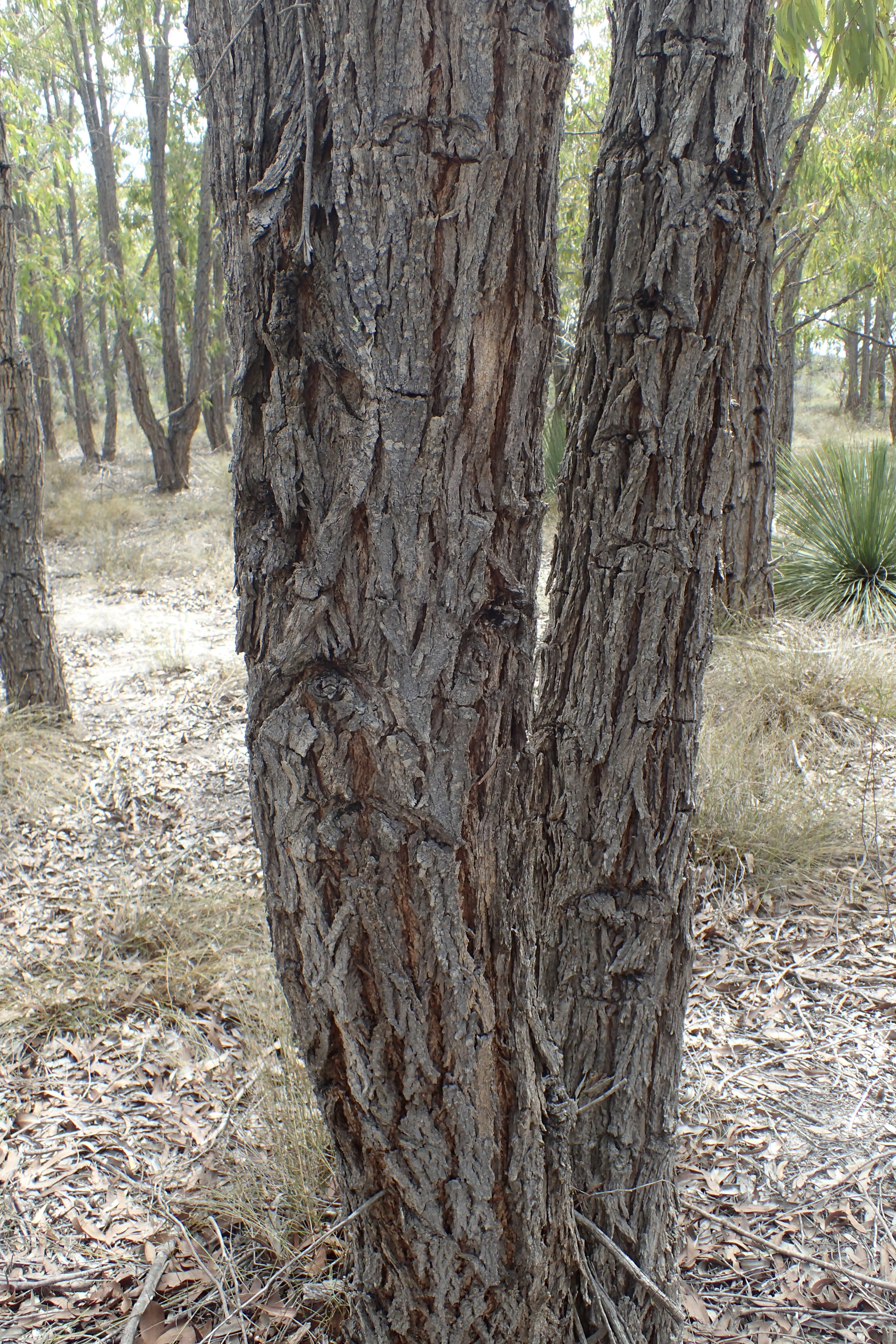
Bark

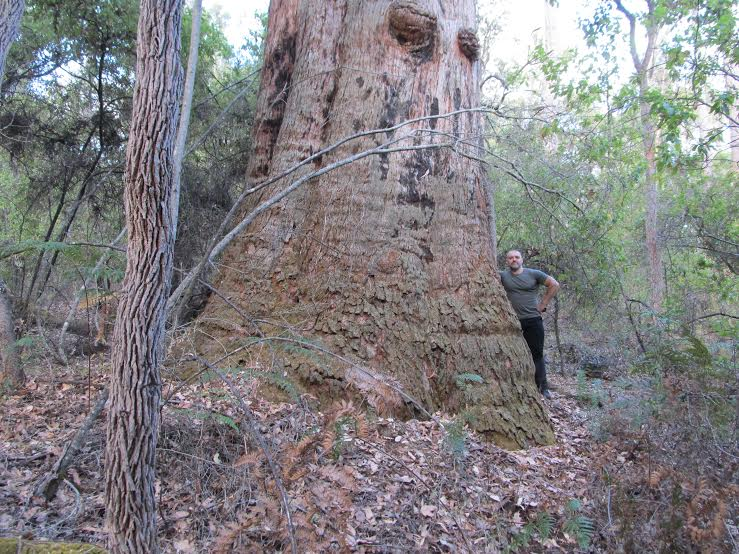
The Dominator, the largest yarri tree

Eucalyptus patens, commonly known as yarri or blackbutt, is a species of flowering plant in the family Myrtaceae and is endemic to the south-west of Western Australia. It has rough bark on the trunk and branches, lance-shaped leaves, creamy-white flowers and spherical to oval fruit.

== Description ==
Eucalyptus patens is a tree that may grow to a height of 45 m (148 ft) with a dbh of 1.8 m (5 ft 11 in) but is a smaller tree or mallee on less favourable sites. The thick, corky, friable bark has a rough texture and is deeply longitudinally furrowed. It is grey on the outside with a yellow tinge on the inside surface. The dull bluish green adult leaves are arranged alternately. The leaf blade is lance-shaped, sometimes curved, tapers to a fine point and is typically 10–16 mm (0.39–0.63 in) long and 12–30 mm (0.47–1.18 in) wide on a flat or channelled petiole 10–20 mm (0.39–0.79 in) long. The flower buds are arranged in leaf axils in groups of between seven and eleven on an unbranched peduncle 10–20 mm (0.39–0.79 in) long, the individual buds on pedicels 1–4 mm (0.039–0.157 in) long. Mature buds are club-shaped, with a hemispherical to conical operculum 5–6 mm (0.20–0.24 in) long and 6–7 mm (0.24–0.28 in) with on a bell-shaped, similarly-sized floral cup. The flowers are creamy-white and appear between July and August or November and February. The fruit is a woody, more or less spherical to oval capsule 9–14 mm (0.35–0.55 in) long and 9–12 mm (0.35–0.47 in) wide with the valves below rim level.

== Taxonomy ==
The species was first formally described by the botanist George Bentham in 1867 in Flora Australiensis. The type specimens included material collected by Augustus Oldfield near the Harvey River sometime in 1840s.

The epithet patens is Latin, meaning spreading or outspread, referring to the form of the tree "standing open", although this is not a characteristic that distinguishes the species. The common name, yarri, is Aboriginal in origin.

The common name "blackbutt", distinguished as Swan River or Western Australian blackbutt, is shared by other dissimilar Eucalyptus species in the centre and east of Australia. The vernacular "blackbutt" is a reference to the colour of the trunk, sometimes blackened by fire. Because of this ambiguity, the extant name yarri has become preferred for the tree, wood, and forest type.

== Distribution ==
Eucalyptus patens grows well in gravelly soils with sandy clay or loam. It is often found in depressions, along stream banks or in valleys in the Peel, South West and Great Southern regions. The range extends as far north as the Avon River. The species still occurs in the Darling range, near the reservoirs Canning Dam, Mundaring Weir and Serpentine Dam, and at Mount Cooke, the range's highest peak.

== Ecology ==
Yarri is regarded as one of the six forest giants found in Western Australia; the other trees include; Eucalyptus gomphocephala (tuart), Eucalyptus diversicolor (karri), Eucalyptus jacksonii (red tingle), Eucalyptus marginata (jarrah) and Corymbia calophylla (marri).

On the Darling Plateau, yarri is found in deeper valleys with jarrah or marri above the freshwater paperbark and flooded gum, moitch, and on slopes above swamp plant communities on minor tributaries. The species sometimes occurs in stands of several close growing individuals. The juvenile leaves are broad and face upward, allowing the sapling to compete in the shadows of other trees and tall shrubs, assuming the usual elongate and down facing leaves of eucalypts when mature.

The flowers attract many insects and birds, feeding on the nectar or preying on others. Insects are also likely to be diverse and numerous on the foliage, due to the rich soil fertility and associated trees in its habitat. Rosellas (Platycercus), honeyeaters (Meliphagidae) and ringneck parrots are often observed feeding around the tree. The roughly textured bark provides diverse habitat and refuge for insects, which are searched out by sitellas (Neosittidae) moving along the branches. The grey honeyeater (Conopophila whitei) also seeks insects along the furrows, instead of its usual method of aerial hunting.

== Uses ==
It is in short supply as a harvestable timber as significant areas of its distribution are now covered by conservation reserves. In addition, even in forest where timber harvesting is allowed, informal reserves placed around streams exclude the tree, which predominantly occurs in the wetter parts of the landscape. The timber is amongst the world's most non-flammable.

The heartwood is light to dark brown in colour. It is hard, durable and has a coarse to intermediate texture and interlocked to straight grain. The air dried density of the wood is 690 to 915 kilograms per cubic metre (43 to 57 lb/cu ft) and is it suitable for construction, railway sleepers and flooring. The timber has similar properties to jarrah (Eucalyptus marginata), though it is paler and has more limited availability.

It is a viable tree to cultivate, and numbers of publications and websites have clear information on cultivation well away from its normal habitat. The seed is contained in a capsule that can be collected at any time of the year and will germinate without special treatment.

The tree produces a large amount of pollen and flowers before marri, a major source of nectar, so this can be used to increase the beehive's brood.
