= Bannister River =

River in Western Australia

Coordinates: 32°47′28″S 116°28′52″E

Location
- Country: Australia

Physical characteristics
- Source
  - elevation: 329 metres (1,079 ft)
- Mouth
  - location: Hotham River
  - elevation: 209 metres (686 ft)
- Length: 50 km (31 mi)

Bannister River is a river in the South West region of Western Australia.

The river rises to the east of North Bannister and flows in a southerly direction discharging into the Hotham River near Boddington.

The river was named after Captain Thomas Bannister who was the first European to visit the river in 1830 by Surveyor General John Septimus Roe in 1832.
