= Connor Tingley =

American artist

Connor Tingley (born October 7, 1993) is an American artist, living and working in Los Angeles, California.

== Family ==
Connor Tingley was born in Torrance, California, on October 7, 1993. He has a twin brother, Austin, who also lives and works in Los Angeles.

== Early inspiration ==
Animation and character design was an early interest—one that was inspired by Pixar films. Tingley's growing skills and varied attention eventually led to the search for a mentor, and Tingley began an eight-year apprenticeship with illustrator and designer, Professor Sheldon Borenstein. Here, Tingley studied Florentine painting, anatomy, life drawing and Chiaroscuro lighting from age 10. Tingley spent his time observing, drawing, and studying a period of "fundamental growth" that helped him to understand the construction of figures and nature.

== Education ==
Following a lengthy mentorship, Tingley worked in toy design at Jakks Pacific and went on to ArtCenter College of Design in Pasadena, to study illustration with the intention to work at Pixar Animation Studios. Simultaneously, he was part of a creative collective with high school peers, designing a range of media assets for musicians and companies, and extensively travelling. Ultimately, he chose to leave ArtCenter and pursue a wide range of opportunities, which immediately involved touring, designing album covers, and providing creative direction for artists.

== Exploring different art forms ==
His artwork appeared on the cover of Vogue Russia, captured by Swiss photographer Michel Comte in 2016. It was at this time that Tingley developed a collaborative relationship with legendary hairstylist Peter Savic, who famously created looks for Madonna.

Through Savic, Tingley's work was introduced to French cosmetic founder and art director Francois Nars; Nars tapped the artist for his Marie Claire fashion feature in September 2016, which featured Tingley's hand-painted silk veils. Tingley and Nars collaborated on cosmetics released in 2019. Tingley's Los Angeles based creative agency, Cool LLC, designed packaging, identity and color palette for the collaboration.

Tingley's solo exhibition in Bucharest on March 23, 2017, was held at Uzina Electrica Filaret. The premiere of the exhibition "Raw Intimacy" curated by Adrian Buga showcased 29 works along with a collaboration between Tingley and Savic. Tingley describes the paintings in the exhibition as having, "a lot of translucent layers in which you can see bone and flesh. They metaphorically combine; there is nothing to hide.”

== Recent exhibition ==
Tingley and Savic's latest collaboration is an exhibition at St. Michael's Church in Vienna on March 6. Titled, "The Meat Series," this exhibition features a series of paintings using hair as a medium. "To create these paintings, we use hair to emulate and study the microstructures of the life’s pillars and in doing so we found the uncanny resemblance between the forms of hair and muscle fiber; between outside and inside, and between death and life," stated Tingley. "Using hair as our medium to explore shape, we let it fall on canvas, trusting nature's rhythm to emulate its natural design in the muscles’ ripples, layers and form.”
