= Frankland River (Western Australia) =

River in Western Australia

Frankland Nyungar: Kwakoorillup
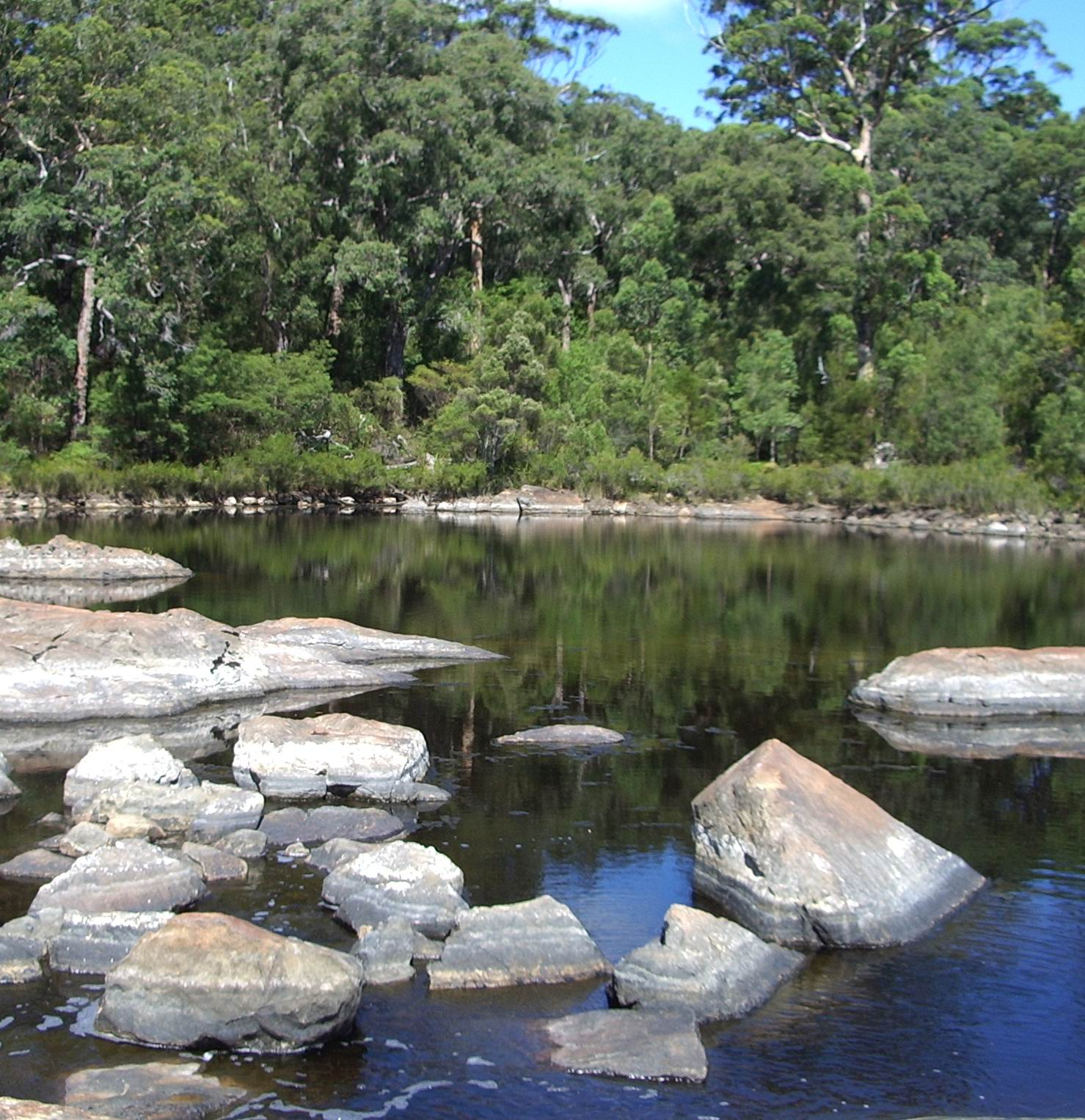
- Circular pool in the Frankland River

- Location of the river mouth in Western Australia

Location
- Country: Australia
- State: Western Australia
- Region: Great Southern

Physical characteristics
- Source confluence: Towerlup Brook and Ornabullup Creek
  - location: Trollup Hill
  - coordinates: 34°10′24″S 117°0′17″E
  - elevation: 215 m (705 ft)
- Mouth: Nornalup Inlet
  - location: west of Walpole
  - coordinates: 34°59′53″S 116°45′00″E
- Length: 162 km (101 mi)
- Basin size: 5,722 km^{2} (2,209 sq mi)
- Discharge
  - location: river mouth
  - average: 17.7 m^{3}/s (630 cu ft/s)

Basin features
- Tributaries
  - left: Gordon River
- National park: Walpole-Nornalup

The Frankland River is a river in the Great Southern region of Western Australia. It is the largest river by volume in the region, and the eighth largest in the state. The traditional owners of the area are the Menang Noongar people, who know the river as Kwakoorillup, meaning 'place of quokka'.

== Location and features ==
Mount Frankland, past which the Frankland River flows, was named in December 1829 by naval ship's surgeon Thomas Braidwood Wilson after George Frankland, the Surveyor General of Van Diemen's Land. Wilson explored the area in company with the Noongar Mokare from King George Sound, John Kent (officer in charge of the Commissariat at Frederick Town, King George Sound), two convicts and Private William Gough of the 39th Regiment, while his ship Governor Phillip was being repaired at King George Sound. The river was sighted by Captain Thomas Bannister in January 1831, and was named by Governor James Stirling when Bannister reported its existence to him. Stirling's choice was influenced by Wilson's naming of Mount Frankland. The Frankland River was apparently known previously by sealers as Deep River.

The Gordon River, a tributary of the Frankland River, has its source south-west of the town of Broomehill. The other two smaller tributaries are Towerlup Brook and Ornabullup Creek. The Walpole, the Deep and the Frankland rivers all flow into the Nornalup Inlet west of Walpole.

85% of the Frankland River's catchment, mostly about the 800 millimetres (31 in) rainfall isohyet, is cleared for agriculture. The main land uses are cereal cropping and sheep grazing, with minor dairy farming, agroforestry, viticulture and olive farming.

Salinity has increased in the river system with average values of 2 parts per thousand (PPT) in the 1970s to 1980s to 30 PPT since 2000.

== See also ==
- List of rivers of Australia § Western Australia

== Sources ==
- Cross, Joseph, ed. (1833). Journals of Several Expeditions Made in Western Australia, during the years 1829, 1830, 1831, and 1832; under the Sanction of the Governor, Sir James Stirling, Containing the Latest Authentic Information Relative to That Country, Accompanied by a Map (PDF). Holborn: Joseph Cross. Wikidata Q19113848.
  - Wilson, Thomas Braidwood (1833). "Extract of a letter received from Dr. J. B. Wilson, R.N., dated King George's Sound, 15th Dec. 1829". In Cross (1833), pp. 14–26.
  - Bannister, Thomas (1833). "A Report of Captain Bannister's Journey to King George's Sound, over Land". In Cross (1833), pp. 98–109.
