= Deep River (Western Australia) =

River in Western Australia

Coordinates: 35°00′22.03″S 116°42′19.19″E

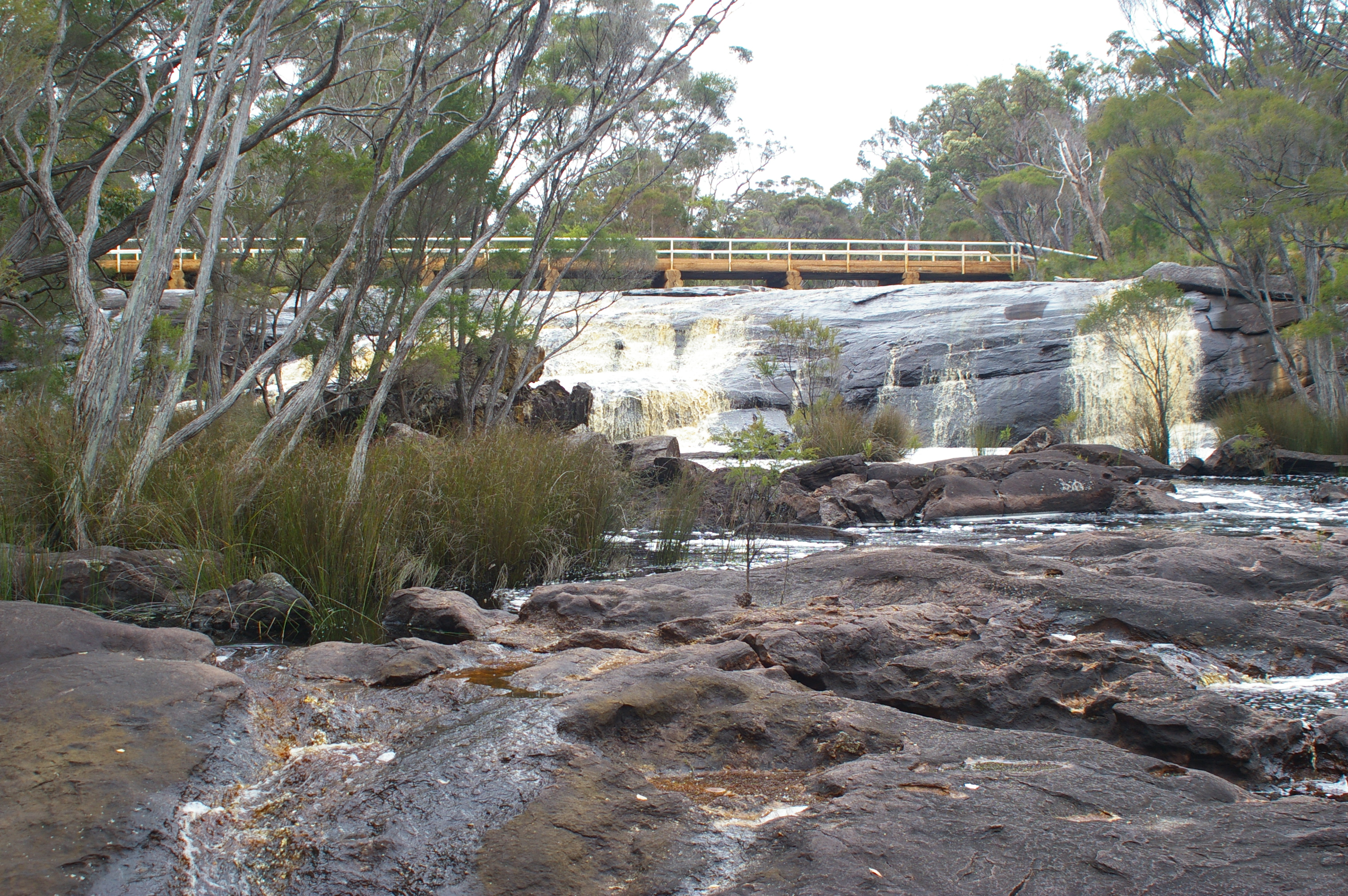
- Fernhook Falls on the Deep River

Location
- Country: Australia

Physical characteristics
- Source
  - location: Near Lake Muir
  - elevation: 183 metres (600 ft)
- Mouth
  - location: Nornalup Inlet
- Length: 120 kilometres (75 mi)
- Basin size: 100 km^{2} (39 sq mi)
- Discharge
  - average: 172,000 ML/a (5.5 m^{3}/s; 192 cu ft/s)

The Deep River is a river in the Great Southern region of Western Australia.

The river is under tidal influence for the last 6 kilometres (4 mi) of its length.

Although generally shallow, the Deep River has depths of up to 6.5 metres (21 ft) in places. The Deep River is one of the few perennial rivers in Western Australia although 80% of its discharge occurs in winter and spring.

The river's water quality is very good, fresh and low in nutrients. The majority of the catchment of the Deep River is not cleared. The silt and clay content can be high during the winter period. The Deep River begins just west of Lake Muir about 50 km from the coast on the edge of the Yilgarn Plateau. Lake Muir may, in flood, overflow into the Deep River catchment. It flows through a valley between granite hills then wanders across the coastal plain, finally entering the Nornalup Inlet on the western side.

The two tributaries of the Deep River are the Weld River and Croea Brook.

Some features of the river include wide unobstructed pools interspersed with rapids such as Rowell's Pool and two waterfalls, Fernhook Falls and Gladstone Falls.

The Deep River flows through forested areas of national park including the Walpole-Nornalup National Park before discharging into the Nornalup Inlet.

The first recorded name of the river was given in 1841 by the Colonial Secretary, Peter Broun. It had been known as the Frankland River by sealers that operated in the area. The explorer William Nairne Clark named it the West River on his charts but Broun later decided on the current name.
