= Nornalup Inlet =

Inlet on southern coast of Western Australia

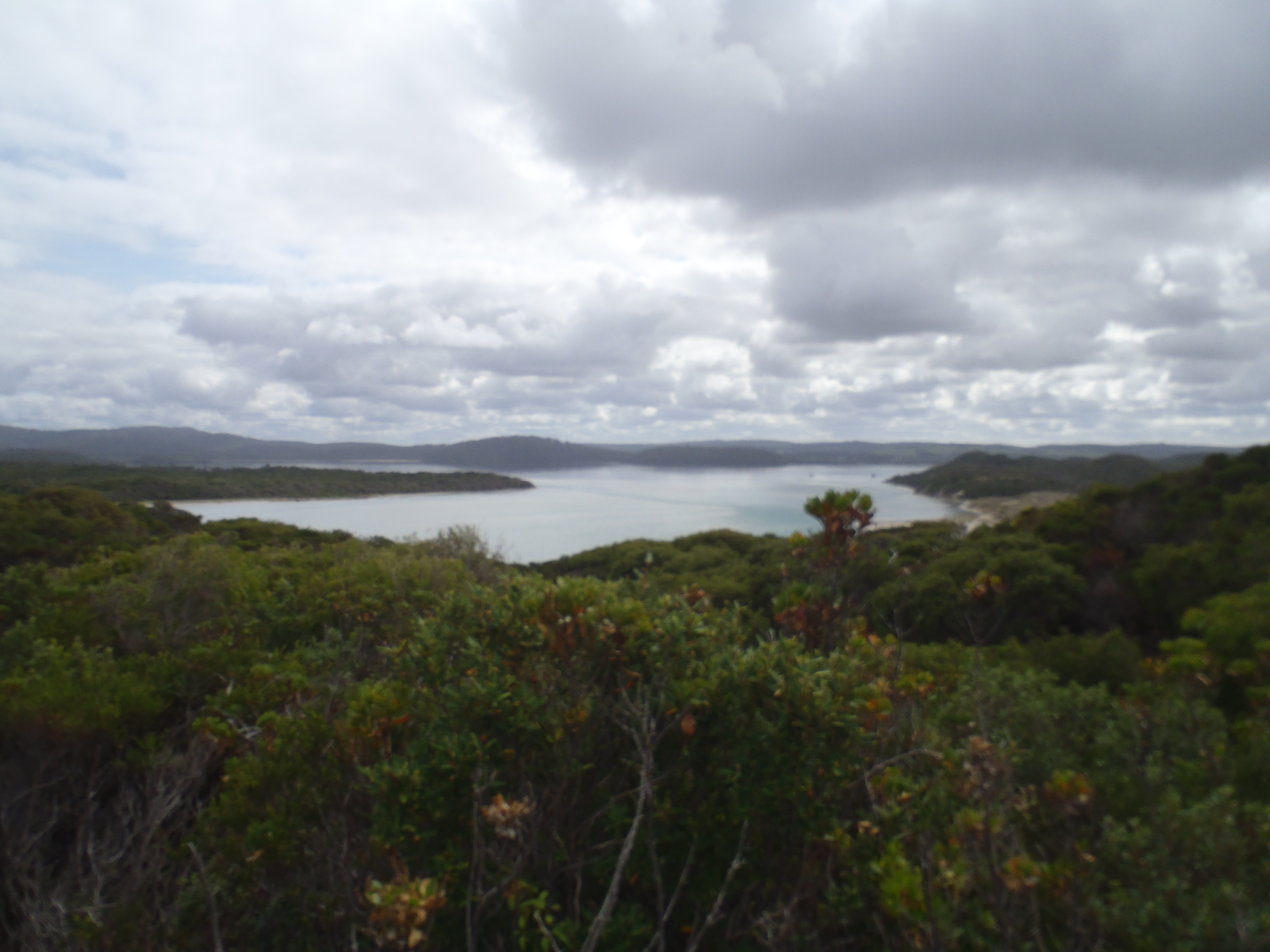
- Nornalup inlet from the dunes to the south of the inlet

- Interactive map of Nornalup Inlet
- Coordinates: 35°02′24″S 116°43′36″E
- Country: Australia
- State: Western Australia
- LGA: Shire of Manjimup

Nornalup Inlet ( /ˈnoːnələp ˈɪnlət/ Australian English) is an estuarine body of water on the south coast of the South West of Australia, approximately 450 kilometres (280 mi) from Perth.

It is approximately 1,300 hectares (3,200 acres) in extent, and up to 5 metres (16 ft) deep. It is fed by the Deep and Frankland Rivers, and communicates with the Walpole Inlet via a natural channel approximately 1 kilometre (0.62 mi) long and 2 metres (6 ft 7 in) deep.

The name is Noongar in origin, meaning 'the place of the tiger snake' (Notechis scutatus).

The estuary is wave dominated and is mostly not modified but the catchment has been substantially cleared. The inlets have a naturally low turbidity but have a high sediment trapping efficiency. The inlets have a total area of 15.8 square kilometres (6.1 sq mi), most of the area being found in the central basin. The inlet has a mean depth of 2 metres (6 ft 7 in).

The Walpole-Nornalup inlet system is the only permanently open estuarine system in the South West, giving it great biological diversity.

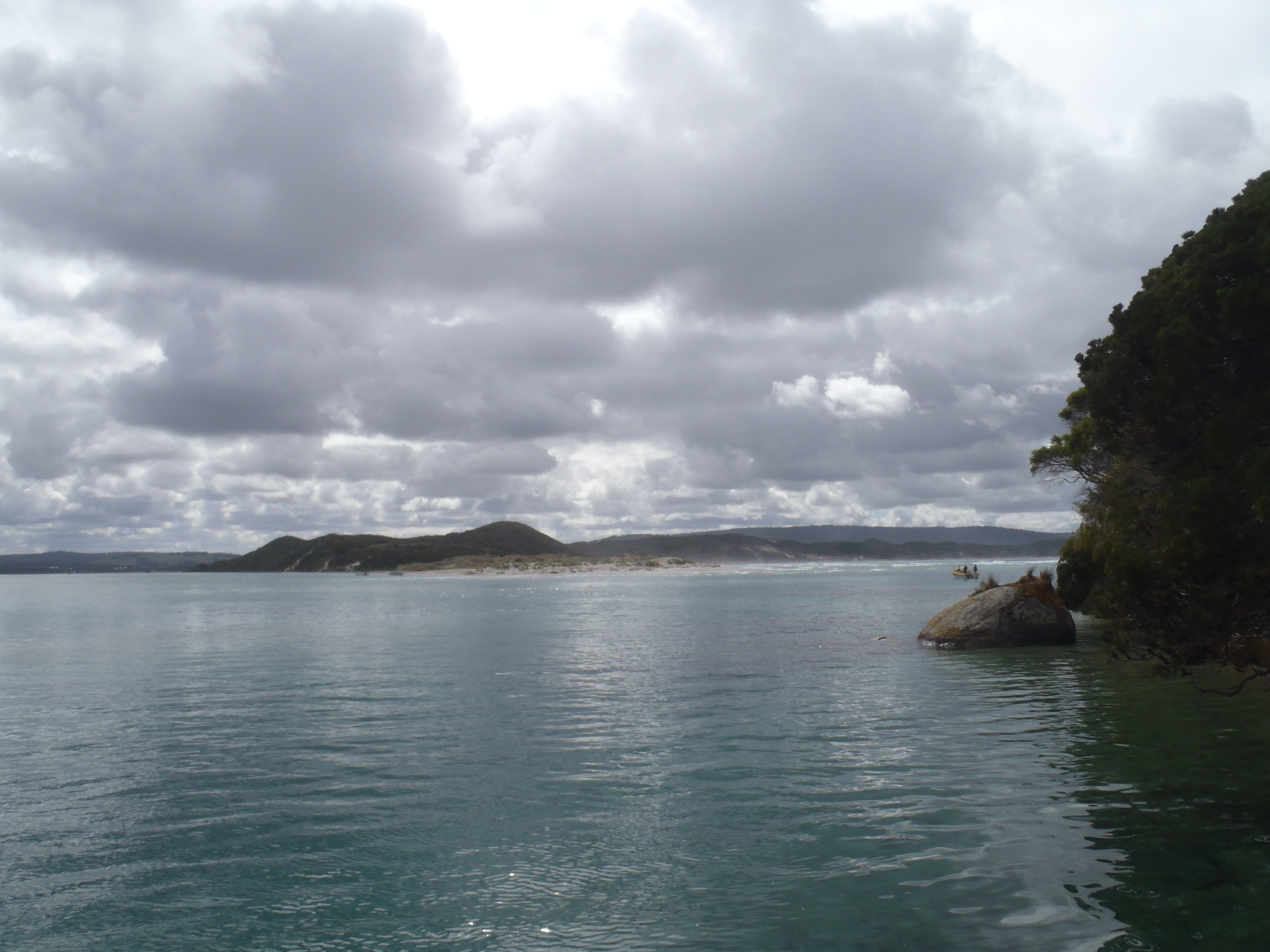
Channel at entry of Inlet from Southern Ocean

The Casuarina Isles and Goose Island lie off the coast just to the south of the inlet

Remains of Aboriginal rock fish traps can still be found in the inlets. The main sea grasses found in the inlet are Ruppia megacarpa and Heterozostera tasmanica.

Captain Thomas Bannister and his party visited the inlet in 1831, although sealers had been based in the area since before 1826.

Both estuaries, with the tidal parts of the tributary rivers, were considered as a proposed marine park in 2006. The marine park is well established, also including the tidal zones of the Frankland, Deep and Walpole Rivers.
