= Lake Muir =

Lake in Western Australia

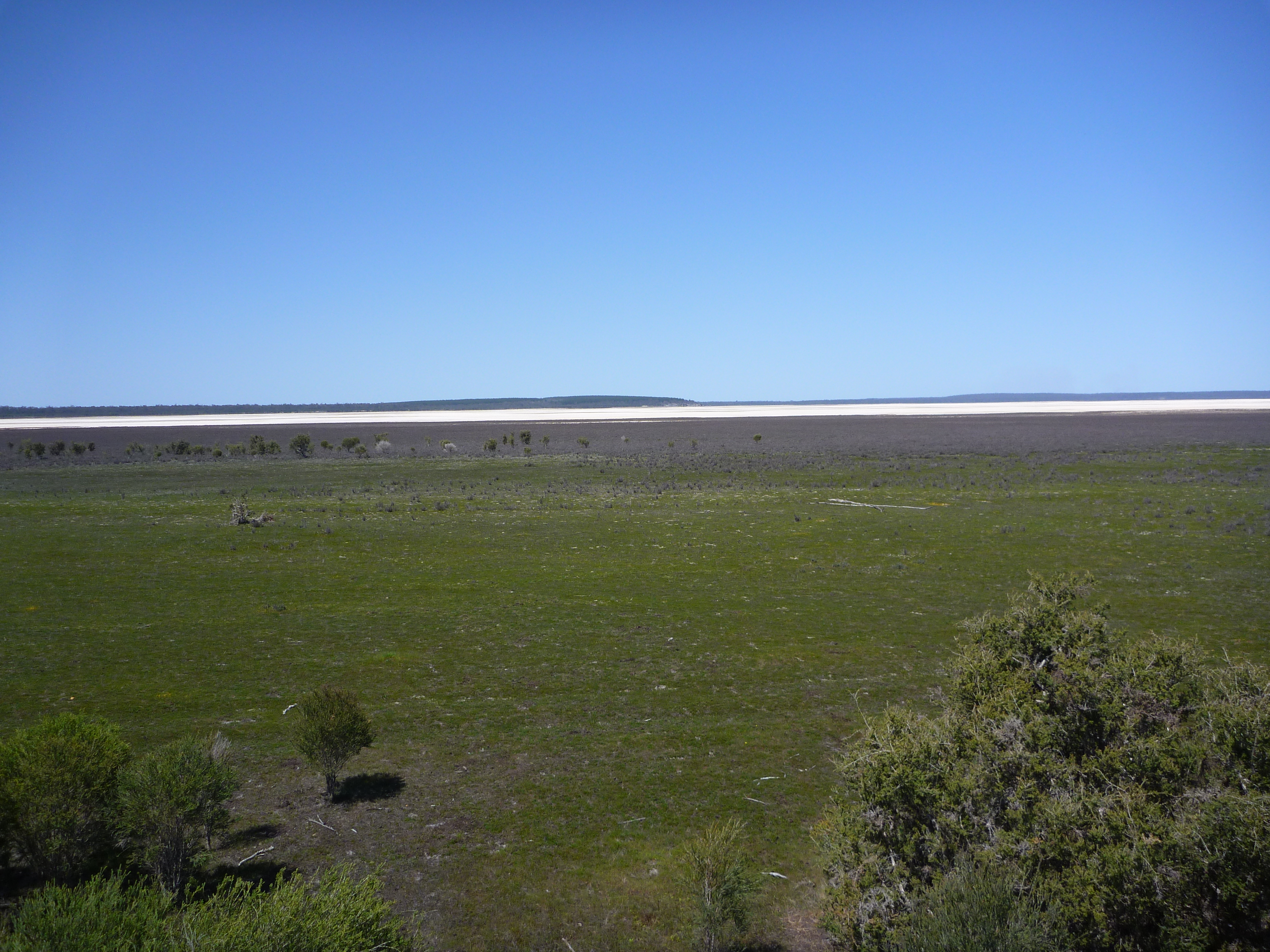
- Lake Muir in October 2010

- Location in Western Australia
- Interactive map of Lake Muir
- Location: South West, Western Australia
- Coordinates: 34°26′49″S 116°44′54″E
- Primary outflows: Deep River
- Catchment area: 384 km^{2} (148 sq mi)
- Basin countries: Australia
- Designation: Muir-Byenup System Ramsar Site
- Max. length: 11 km (6.8 mi)
- Max. width: 5 km (3.1 mi)
- Surface area: 46 km^{2} (18 sq mi)
- Surface elevation: 170 m (560 ft)

Lake Muir is a freshwater lake, with a larger surrounding wetlands area, in the South West region of Western Australia. The lake lies near Muir Highway, north of Walpole and southeast of Manjimup.

== Description ==
The lake has a surface area of 46 square kilometres (18 sq mi). Lake Muir and its surrounding wetland lies within the Lake Muir-Byenup System, a 694 km^{2} (268 sq mi) area of internal drainage containing a complex of wetland systems. It is fed by a stream leading into the lake, which is crossed at the Lake Muir Bridge.

Lake Muir may, in flood, overflow southwest into the Deep River catchment (and possibly also southeast into the Frankland River via Poorginup Gully). Lake Muir is usually brackish (1000–3000 mg/L TDS) at the end of winter, saline by summer and dry throughout autumn.

Lake Muir is protected within Lake Muir Nature Reserve, which was designated in 2001.

== Flora and fauna ==
A 14-square-kilometre (5.4 sq mi) section of wetland around Lake Muir has been identified by BirdLife International as an Important Bird Area (IBA) because it provides habitat for 10 or more pairs of endangered Australasian bitterns. The wetlands within the IBA are shallow with extensive beds of dense sedgeland and fringing stands of shrubland and woodland. Lake Muir has been excluded from the IBA as it is unsuitable for bitterns but it has supported large numbers of Australian shelduck and may prove to be globally significant for that species.

== History ==
The lake is connected with significant Indigenous occupation over time.

Lake Muir was named after brothers Thomas and John Muir, the first European settlers in the Warren district, who settled at Deeside, 25 kilometres (16 mi) west of the lake, in 1852 and built a rush hut there in 1856.

Historically the area was a Game Reserve, with a duck shooting season. The Department of Environment and Conservation started monitoring the wetlands system in 1980, to manage the duck shooting.

On 5 January 2001, a 106-square-kilometre (41 sq mi) area was designated, under the Ramsar Convention as Ramsar site 1050, a wetland of international importance, acknowledging its rich ecological diversity. Lake Muir Nature Reserve was designated in the same year by the government of Western Australia.

A magnitude 5.7 earthquake was centred at the lake on 16 September 2018 and was followed by a magnitude 4.7 quake on 13 October and a 5.4 quake on 9 November.

== See also ==
- List of lakes of Australia § Western Australia
