= Tingler (surname) =

Tingler is a surname. Notable people with the name include:

- Jayce Tingler (born 1980), American baseball manager
- Philipp Tingler (born 1970), Swiss and German writer
- Richard Lee Tingler, an FBI most wanted fugitive listee in 1968, see FBI Ten Most Wanted Fugitives by year, 1968

== See also ==
- Tingley (disambiguation), includes a list of people with surname Tingley
