= Thomas Bannister =

Soldier and explorer (1799–1874)

Thomas Bannister (1799–1874) was a soldier and explorer in Western Australia. He was born in Steyning, Sussex in 1799, and arrived in Western Australia in 1829, age 30, with the rank of Captain aboard the Atwick with 3 servants from London, England.

Upon arriving in Fremantle he accompanied Thomas Braidwood Wilson to select land for settlement along the Canning River.

Later the same year he explored the base of the Darling Range and then lead an expedition from Perth to Albany accepting land grants along the way. Bannister came to Forth River and Frankland River in 1831.

Leaving the colony in 1835 (renting his Canning land to William Nairn), and went to Victoria where he became a founding member of the Port Philip Association.

He is the brother of Saxe Bannister, the first Attorney General of New South Wales.

Thomas Bannister died in 1874. The Bannister River, the town of North Bannister, and Bannister Street, Fremantle, are all named after him.
