= Walpole-Nornalup National Park =

National park in Western Australia

- IUCN category II (national park)
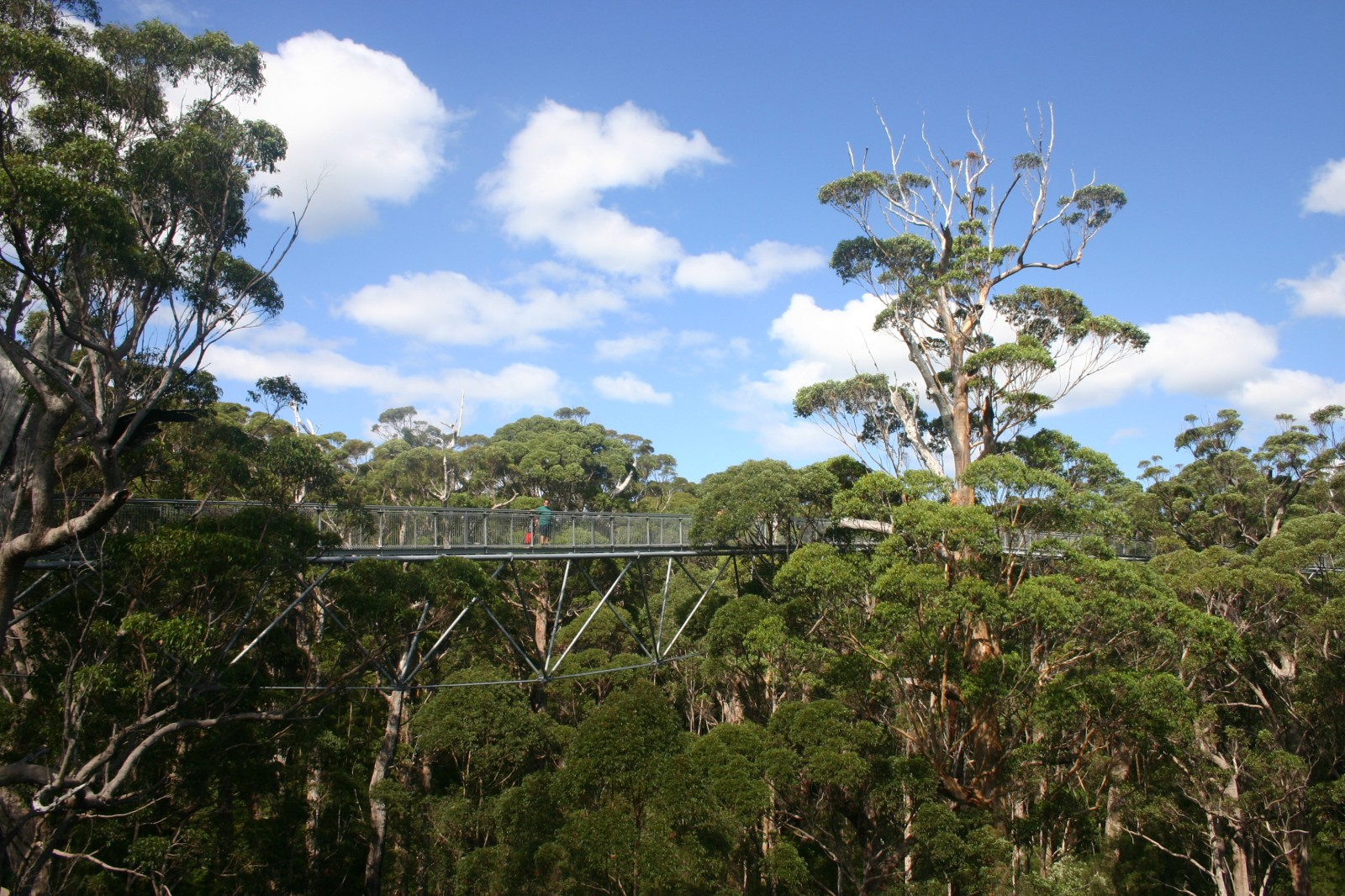
- The Tree Top Walk in the Valley of the Giants

- Location within Western Australia
- Location: Western Australia
- Nearest city: Walpole
- Coordinates: 34°59′S 116°46′E
- Area: 194.48 km^{2} (75.09 sq mi)
- Established: 1957
- Governing body: Department of Environment and Conservation
- Website: Official website

Walpole-Nornalup National Park is a national park in the South West region of Western Australia, 355 kilometres (221 mi) south of Perth. It is famous for its towering karri and tingle trees. Red tingle trees are unique to the Walpole area. The park is part of the larger Walpole Wilderness Area that was established in 2004, an international biodiversity hotspot.

== History ==
The traditional owners of the area are the Murrum of the Minang peoples of the larger Noongar group who have inhabited the region for over 30,000 years.

The park is named after the nearby town of Walpole which in turn honours William Walpole, who served alongside James Stirling on HMS Warspite in 1809. The Noongar peoples know the area as Nor-Nor-Nup, meaning 'the place of the black snake', which was anglicised as Nornalup.

The explorer William Nairne Clark visited the area in 1841 and sailed up the Frankland River. The botanist and explorer Ferdinand von Mueller explored the area in 1877. The Bellanger family were the first European settlers to arrive in the area in 1910, settling alongside the Frankland River and building a homestead in 1914. The park was first declared in 1910 when James Mitchell the Minister of Lands and Agriculture visited the area and was so impressed with the beauty that he set aside 370 hectares (910 acres) for conservation as an A-class reserve. Another portion west of the Irwin Inlet was declared as a reserve in 1912 and later absorbed into the park.

The park received 158,167 visitors through 2008–2009.

== Tourism ==
The Valley of the Giants is one of the main tourist draws in the area. Those with a head for heights can get a tree top view on the Tree Top Walk a 40-metre-high (130 ft) walk way that can accommodate wheelchairs. Most similar canopy walks around the world are constructed using suspension bridge-type structures. The Tree Top Walk, however, is a series of 60-metre (200 ft), lightweight steel trusses built on steel pylons to form a secure ramp. Beneath the canopy walk there is a pathway around the tingle trees for walkers – this is known as the Ancient Empire. A whale watching vantage point is settled at Conspicuous Beach, providing views of migrating whales (humpback and southern right) and dolphins.

== Environment ==
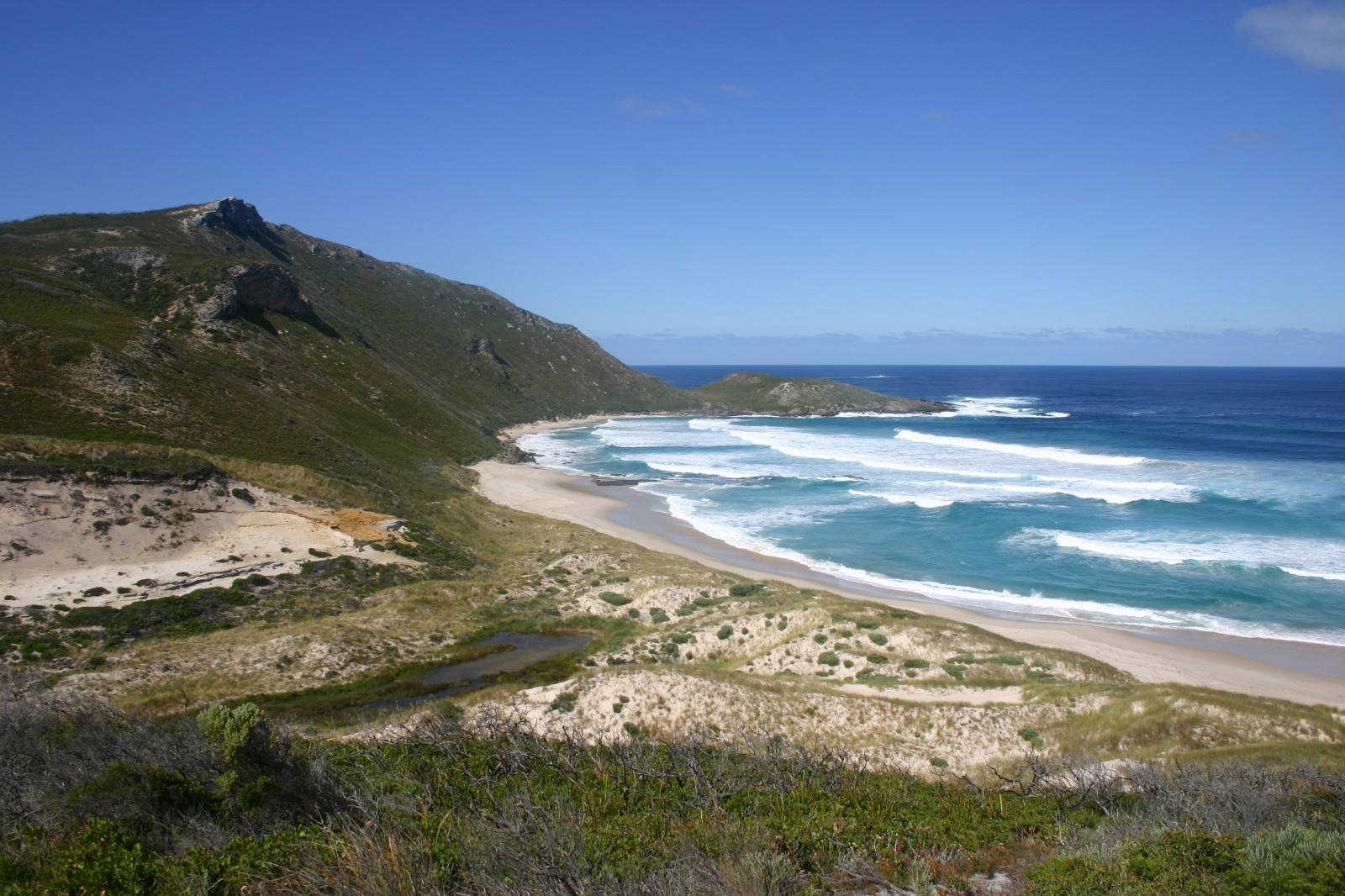
Conspicuous Cliff

The tingle tree has evolved to cope with bush fires and can withstand low level fires. The Department of Parks and Wildlife carries out fuel reduction backburning in the national park; this limits the risk of a large scale bush fire by reducing the amount of dry leaf litter on the ground. Tingles can look completely burned in the inside but continue to survive as they grow from just under the layer of outside bark.

The park also extends to the coast, providing a range of habitats from forest to coastal heathland featuring swamp paperbark and a red flowering gum which is endemic to the region. Conspicuous Cliff is one of the few places the coast is accessible in the national park. The area also the Walpole-Nornalup Inlets, which are fed by the Deep and Frankland rivers.

The Bibbulmun Track winds through the park to the coast.

== Gallery ==
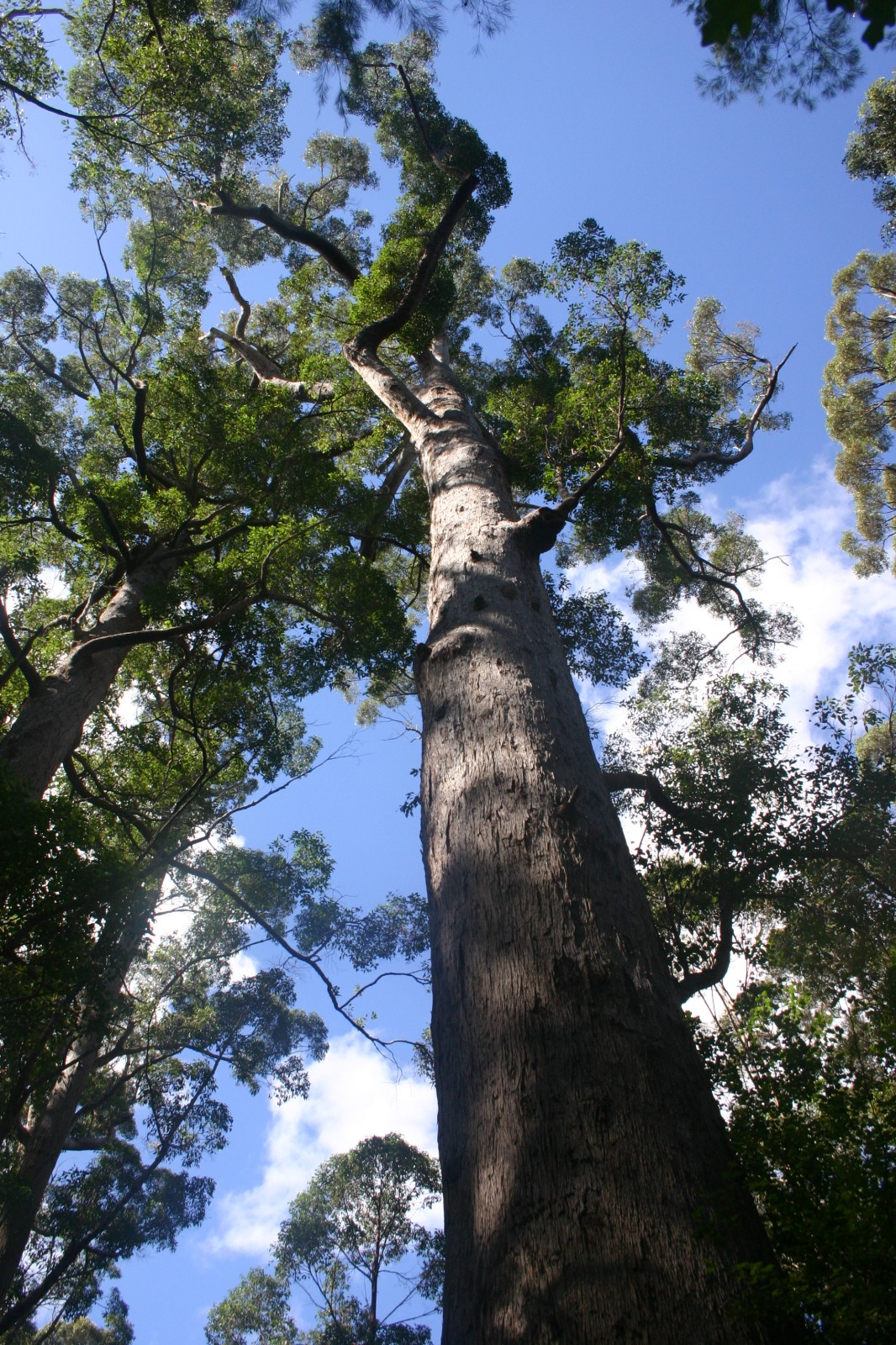
Red tingle

== See also ==
- Protected areas of Western Australia
