= Wandillup, Western Australia =

Locality in the Shire of Bridgetown-Greenbushes, Western Australia

Wandillup
- Town
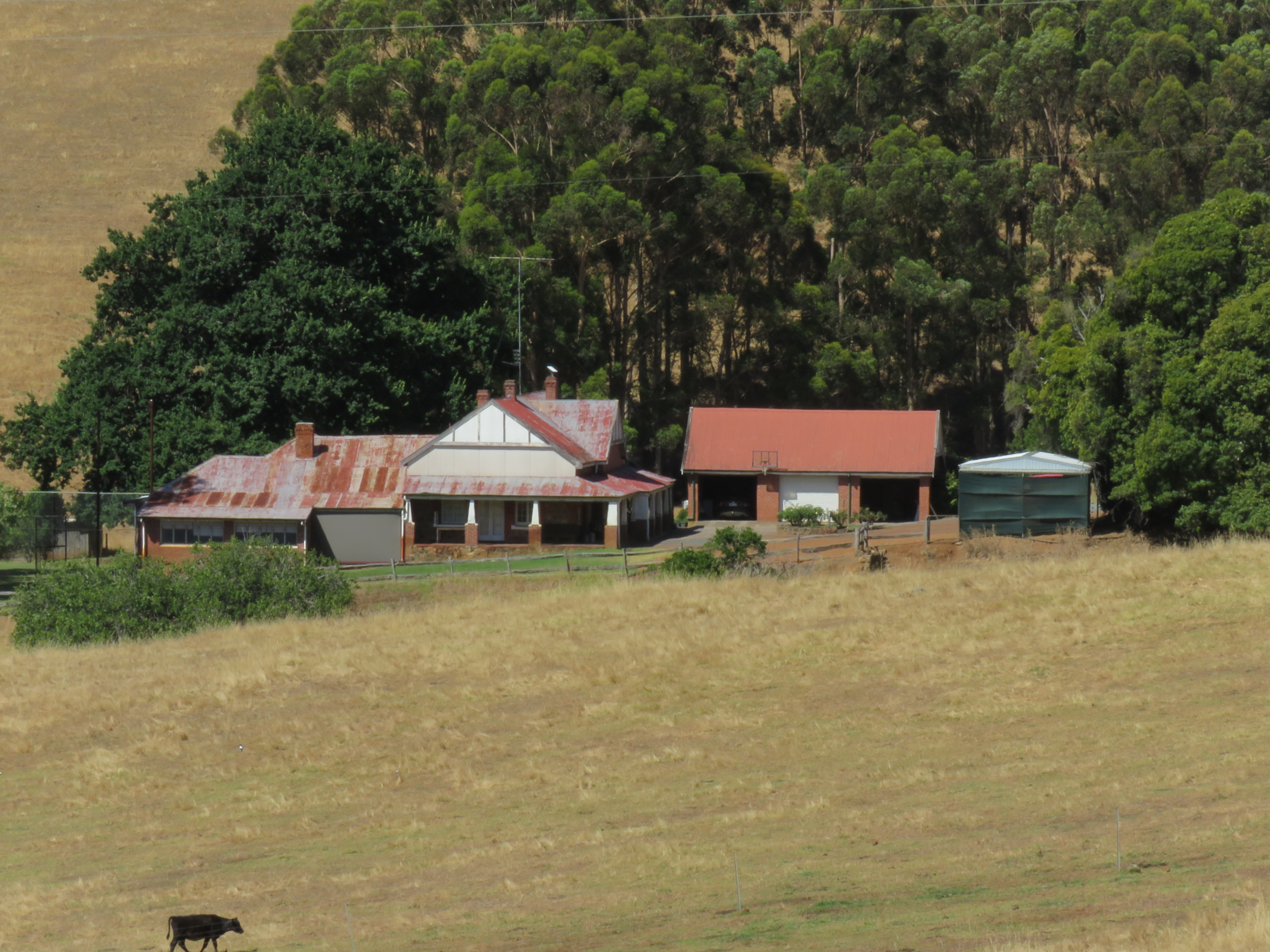
- The heritage listed Orange Grove Farm in Wandillup
- Interactive map of Wandillup
- Coordinates: 34.04°S 116.05°E
- Country: Australia
- State: Western Australia
- LGA: Shire of Bridgetown–Greenbushes
- Location: 267 km (166 mi) from Perth; 104 km (65 mi) from Bunbury; 9 km (5.6 mi) from Bridgetown

Government
  - State electorate: Warren-Blackwood
  - Federal division: O'Connor

Area
  - Total: 137.3 km^{2} (53.0 sq mi)

Population
  - Total: 64 (SAL 2021)
- Postcode: 6256
Localities around Wandillup
Maranup	Hester Brook	Bridgetown
Donnelly River	Wandillup	Glenlynn
Donnelly River	Yornup	Yornup

Wandillup is a rural locality of the Shire of Bridgetown–Greenbushes in the South West region of Western Australia. The north-eastern border of the locality is formed by the Blackwood River.

It is on the traditional land of the Noongar people.
