= Greenbushes (disambiguation) =

Greenbushes may refer to:

- Shire of Greenbushes, a former local government area of Western Australia
- Shire of Bridgetown–Greenbushes, a current local government area of Western Australia
- Greenbushes, Western Australia, a locality and town in Western Australia
- North Greenbushes, Western Australia, a locality and town in Western Australia
- Greenbushes mine, a lithium mine in Western Australia
