= Wilgarrup, Western Australia =

Locality in the Shire of Manjimup, Western Australia

Wilgarrup
- other
- Coordinates: 34.14535°S 116.18274°E
- Country: Australia
- State: Western Australia
- LGA: Shire of Manjimup
- Location: 246 km (153 mi) from Perth; 11 km (6.8 mi) from Manjimup

Government
  - State electorate: Warren-Blackwood
  - Federal division: O'Connor

Area
  - Total: 36.5 km^{2} (14.1 sq mi)

Population
  - Total: 16 (SAL 2021)
- Postcode: 6258
Localities around Wilgarrup
| Yornup | Yornup | Kingston |
| Linfarne | Wilgarrup | Kingston |
| Linfarne | Palgarup | Balbarrup |

Wilgarrup is a rural locality of the Shire of Manjimup in the South West region of Western Australia. The South Western Highway runs through the locality from north to south, as does the Wilgarrup River, a tributary of the Warren River.

Wilgarrup is located on the traditional land of the Bibulman people of the Noongar nation.

Wilgarrup, historically also spelled Wilgarup, was once a stop on the Northcliffe branch railway. The railway line from Bridgetown to Wilgarrup was officially opened on 7 June 1911.

The heritage listed Wilgarrup Homestead was built in 1864 by Tom Thomas for Charles Rose, an early European settler in the area.
