= List of State Register of Heritage Places in the Shire of Bridgetown-Greenbushes =

List of heritage sites in Western Australia

The State Register of Heritage Places is maintained by the Heritage Council of Western Australia. As of 2026, 141 places are heritage-listed in the Shire of Bridgetown-Greenbushes, of which twelve are on the State Register of Heritage Places.

== List ==
The Western Australian State Register of Heritage Places, as of 2026, lists the following twelve state registered places within the Shire of Bridgetown-Greenbushes:

Place name	Place #	Street number	Street name	Suburb or town	Co-ordinates	Notes & former names	Photo
Bridgetown Post Office	240	142	Hampton Street	Bridgetown	33.957592°S 116.137527°E		
Bridgedale, Bridgetown	241		Hampton Street	Bridgetown	33.967877°S 116.134454°E	The Blechynden House	
Freemasons Hotel, Bridgetown	248	2	Steere Street	Bridgetown	33.958467°S 116.13742°E		
Bridgetown Civic and Community Centre	249	1	Steere Street	Bridgetown	33.957956°S 116.137724°E	Bridgetown Town Hall, Mechanic's Institute (site)	
Bridgetown Trainmen's Barracks (former)	250	43	Spencer Street	Bridgetown	33.964404°S 116.138356°E	Railway Barracks (former), Bridgetown Valley Lodge	
Old Gaol & Police Quarters, Bridgetown	254	144	Hampton Street	Bridgetown	33.957362°S 116.137751°E	Bridgetown Police Station and Quarters (former), Old Gaol (Lock-Up)	
Bridgetown Railway Station (former)	256		Railway Reserve	Bridgetown	33.9598°S 116.137725°E	Railway Station and goods Shed	
Geegelup Health Food Shop	2996	130	Hampton Street	Bridgetown	33.958638°S 116.137369°E		
Paterson & Co Fruit Packing Shed Complex	3220	166-168	Hampton Street	Bridgetown	33.95554°S 116.137045°E	Bridgetown Veterinary Hospital	
Bridgetown Roads Board Office (former)	3583	17	Steere Street	Bridgetown	33.958136°S 116.138743°E	Bridgetown Chiropractic Clinic, Nelson Roads Board, Private medical suite	
Brooklyn School	4036	Lot 623	Carbunup Brook Road	Bridgetown	34.031919°S 116.252088°E	Brooklyn Assisted School	
Blue Atlas Cedar Tree	4351		Hampton Street	Bridgetown	33.967404°S 116.135125°E		
