= Winnejup, Western Australia =

Locality in the Shire of Bridgetown-Greenbushes, Western Australia

Winnejup
- Town
- Coordinates: 33.95°S 116.29°E
- Country: Australia
- State: Western Australia
- LGA: Shire of Bridgetown–Greenbushes
- Location: 270 km (170 mi) from Perth; 108 km (67 mi) from Bunbury; 17 km (11 mi) from Bridgetown

Government
  - State electorate: Warren-Blackwood
  - Federal division: O'Connor

Area
  - Total: 160.4 km^{2} (61.9 sq mi)

Population
  - Total: 176 (SAL 2021)
- Postcode: 6255
Localities around Winnejup
Catterick	Benjinup	Boyup Brook
Kangaroo Gully	Winnejup	Mayanup
Sunnyside	Kingston	Yornup

Winnejup is a rural locality of the Shire of Bridgetown–Greenbushes in the South West region of Western Australia. The Blackwood River runs through the locality from east to west.

It is on the traditional land of the Noongar people.

The locality contains a number of heritage-listed properties: the Dalmore, Falnash, Mandalup and Forrest homesteads.
