= Kangaroo Gully, Western Australia =

Locality in the Shire of Bridgetown-Greenbushes, Western Australia

Kangaroo Gully
- Suburb
- Coordinates: 33.96°S 116.20°E
- Country: Australia
- State: Western Australia
- LGA(s): Shire of Bridgetown–Greenbushes
- Location: 263 km (163 mi) from Perth; 99 km (62 mi) from Bunbury; 6 km (3.7 mi) from Bridgetown

Government
  - State electorate(s): Warren-Blackwood
  - Federal division(s): O'Connor

Area
  - Total: 53.1 km^{2} (20.5 sq mi)

Population
  - Total(s): 512 (SAL 2021)
- Postcode: 6255
Suburbs around Kangaroo Gully
Hester	Hester	Winnejup
Bridgetown	Kangaroo Gully	Winnejup
Glenlynn	Sunnyside	Sunnyside

Kangaroo Gully is a rural locality of the Shire of Bridgetown–Greenbushes in the South West region of Western Australia, located adjacent to Bridgetown. The Blackwood River forms the southern border of the locality.

It is on the traditional land of the Noongar people.
