= Hester Brook, Western Australia =

Locality in the Shire of Bridgetown-Greenbushes, Western Australia

Hester Brook
- Suburb
- Coordinates: 33.92°S 116.10°E
- Country: Australia
- State: Western Australia
- LGA: Shire of Bridgetown–Greenbushes
- Location: 252 km (157 mi) from Perth; 87 km (54 mi) from Bunbury; 7 km (4.3 mi) from Bridgetown

Government
  - State electorate: Warren-Blackwood
  - Federal division: O'Connor

Area
  - Total: 51.8 km^{2} (20.0 sq mi)

Population
  - Total: 127 (SAL 2021)
- Postcode: 6255
Suburbs around Hester Brook
Greenbushes	Catterick	Catterick
Maranup	Hester Brook	Hester
Maranup	Wandillup	Bridgetown

Hester Brook is a rural locality of the Shire of Bridgetown–Greenbushes in the South West region of Western Australia. Hester Brook is located on the South Western Highway, which passes through its north-eastern part. The Blackwood River forms the south-western border of the locality.

It is on the traditional land of the Noongar people.

The heritage-listed Peninsula House, a homestead dating back to 1920, is located in Hester Brook, overlooking a bend in the Blackwood River. An earlier cottage at the location, dating back to 1890, was destroyed in a bushfire in 2009. A second heritage-listed building, Parkville, also overlooking a bend in the river, dates back to 1900. An older dwelling at the site, built a decade earlier, is now used as a tool shed.
