= Glenlynn, Western Australia =

Locality in the Shire of Bridgetown-Greenbushes, Western Australia

Glenlynn
- Suburb
- Interactive map of Glenlynn
- Coordinates: 34.01°S 116.15°E
- Country: Australia
- State: Western Australia
- LGA: Shire of Bridgetown–Greenbushes
- Location: 267 km (166 mi) from Perth; 102 km (63 mi) from Bunbury; 8 km (5.0 mi) from Bridgetown

Government
  - State electorate: Warren-Blackwood
  - Federal division: O'Connor

Area
  - Total: 43.1 km^{2} (16.6 sq mi)

Population
  - Total: 112 (SAL 2021)
- Postcode: 6256
Suburbs around Glenlynn
Wandillup	Bridgetown	Kangaroo Gully
Wandillup	Glenlynn	Sunnyside
Wandillup	Yornup	Sunnyside

Glenlynn is a rural locality of the Shire of Bridgetown–Greenbushes in the South West region of Western Australia. The locality is located along the South Western Highway, which passes through it north to south.

In the south-west of the locality of Glenlynn, some talc mining was carried out between 1942 and 1951, with 514 tonnes of talc produced.

Glenlynn was a siding on the Picton to Northcliffe railway opened in 1911, originally named Lights, renamed to Nairnup in 1911 and renamed again, now to Glenlynn, in 1913, until closed in 1967.
