= Sunnyside, Western Australia =

Locality in the Shire of Bridgetown-Greenbushes, Western Australia

Sunnyside
- Suburb
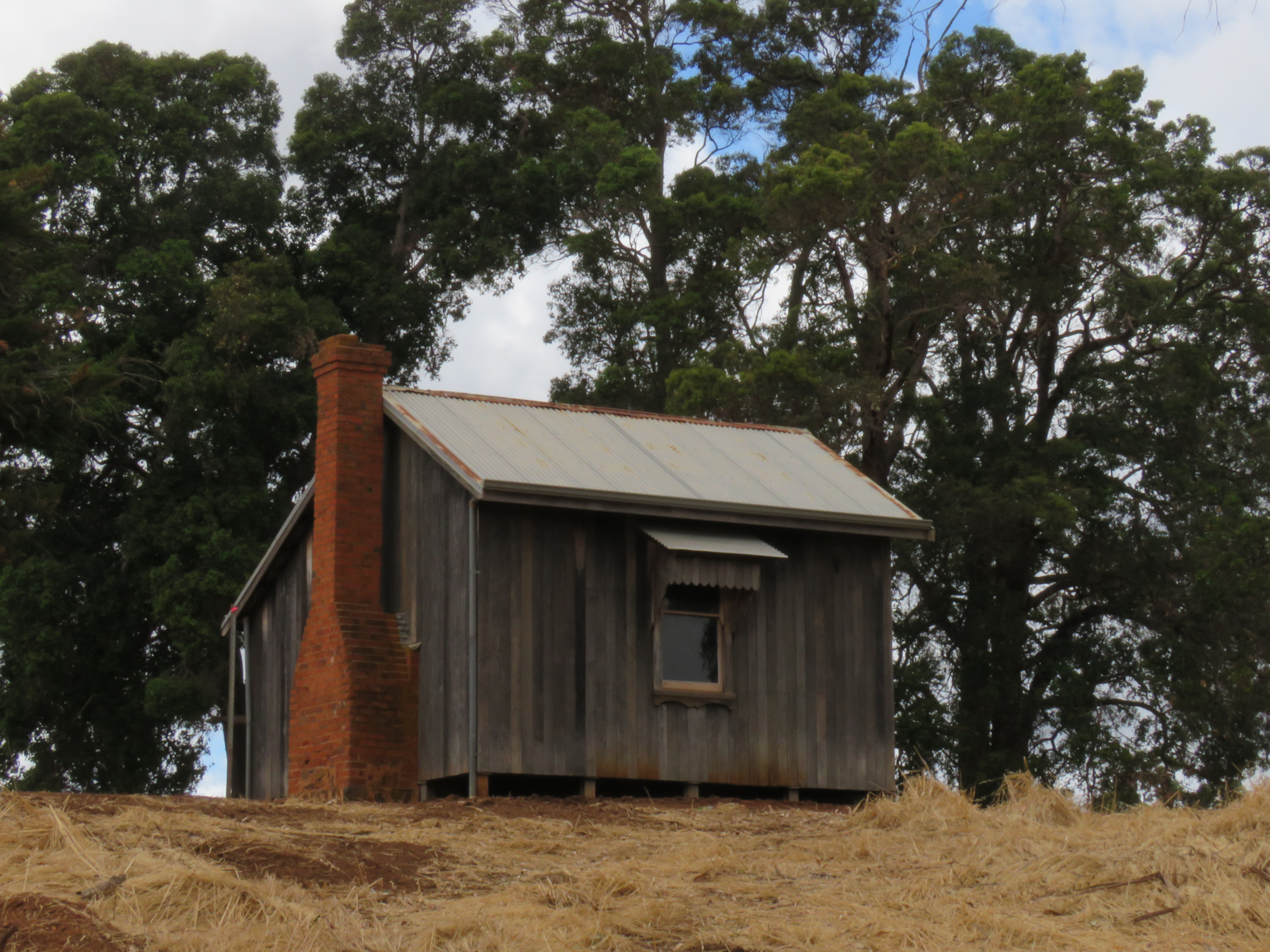
- The state heritage listed Brooklyn School in Sunnyside
- Interactive map of Sunnyside
- Coordinates: 34.02°S 116.25°E
- Country: Australia
- State: Western Australia
- LGA: Shire of Bridgetown–Greenbushes
- Location: 275 km (171 mi) from Perth; 112 km (70 mi) from Bunbury; 17 km (11 mi) from Bridgetown

Government
  - State electorate: Warren-Blackwood
  - Federal division: O'Connor

Area
  - Total: 72.2 km^{2} (27.9 sq mi)

Population
  - Total: 100 (SAL 2021)
- Postcode: 6256
Suburbs around Sunnyside
Kangaroo Gully	Winnejup	Winnejup
Glenlynn	Sunnyside	Winnejup
Yornup	Kingston	Kingston

Sunnyside is a rural locality of the Shire of Bridgetown–Greenbushes in the South West region of Western Australia. The northern border of the locality is formed by the Blackwood River.

It is on the traditional land of the Noongar people.
