= Maranup, Western Australia =

Locality in the Shire of Bridgetown-Greenbushes, Western Australia

Maranup
- Suburb
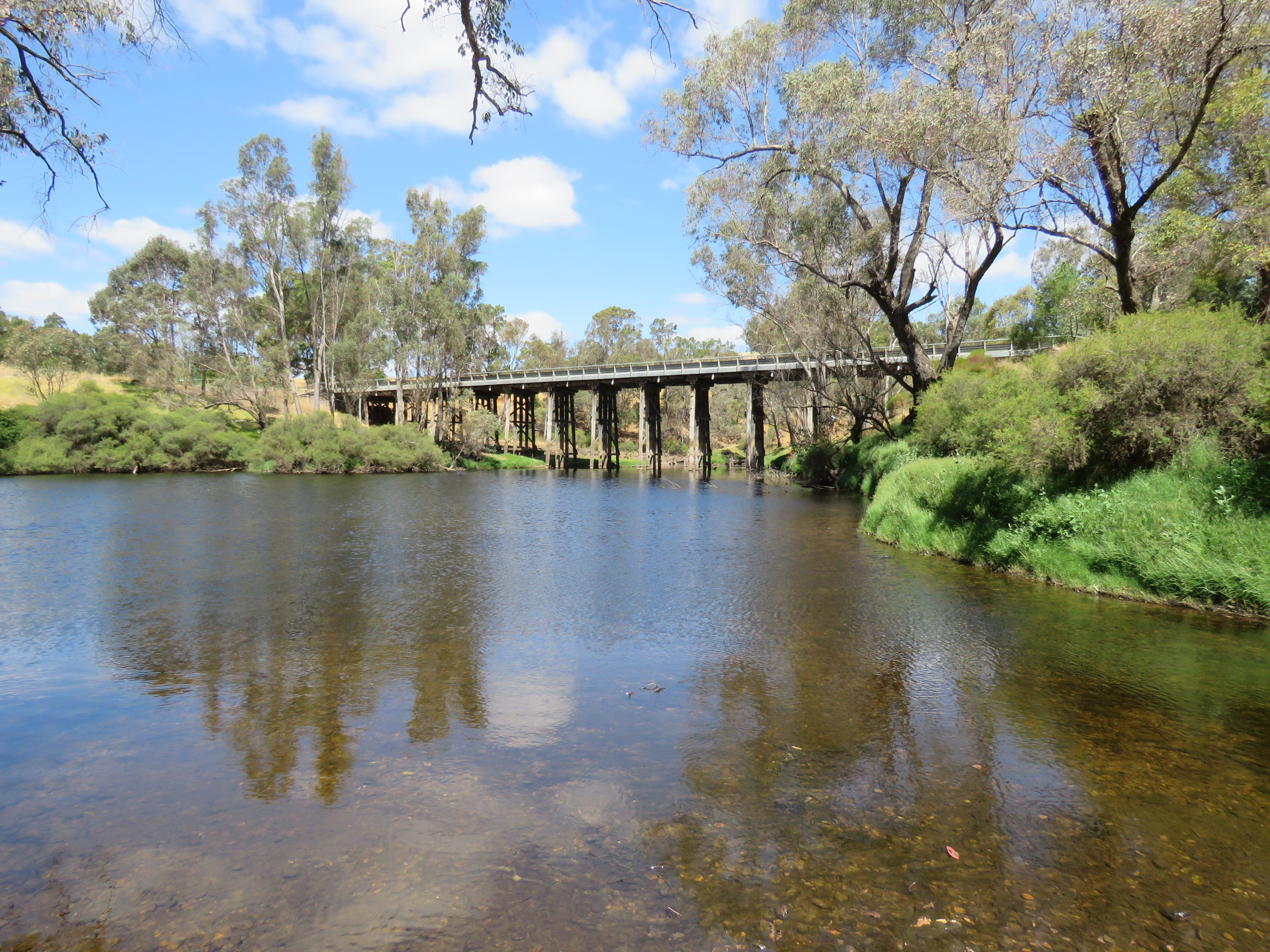
- Maranup Ford Bridge over the Blackwood River
- Coordinates: 33.95°S 116.01°E
- Country: Australia
- State: Western Australia
- LGA: Shire of Bridgetown–Greenbushes
- Location: 255 km (158 mi) from Perth; 91 km (57 mi) from Bunbury; 20 km (12 mi) from Bridgetown

Government
  - State electorate: Warren-Blackwood
  - Federal division: O'Connor

Area
  - Total: 104.8 km^{2} (40.5 sq mi)

Population
  - Total: 60 (SAL 2021)
- Postcode: 6256
Suburbs around Maranup
Southampton	Greenbushes	Greenbushes
Nannup	Maranup	Hester Brook
Donnelly River	Wandillup	Wandillup

Maranup is a rural locality of the Shire of Bridgetown–Greenbushes in the South West region of Western Australia. The Blackwood River passes through the locality from east to west and, in the south-western corner, Maranup is home to the majority of Dalgarup National Park.

It is on the traditional land of the Noongar people.

Maranup Ford, in the centre of the locality, was the main crossing of the Blackwood River for traffic from Manjimup to the port of Bunbury until 1862, when a bridge over the river was built at Bridgetown. In 1898, the Browne family purchased land in the area as a freehold from the crown and built homestead near the ford in 1917. The property remains in the family today, functioning as a working farm and caravan park.
