= Dixvale, Western Australia =

Locality in the Shire of Manjimup, Western Australia

Dixvale
- other
- Coordinates: 34.20182°S 116.05917°E
- Country: Australia
- State: Western Australia
- LGA: Shire of Manjimup
- Location: 251 km (156 mi) from Perth; 9 km (5.6 mi) from Manjimup

Government
  - State electorate: Warren-Blackwood
  - Federal division: O'Connor

Area
  - Total: 21.5 km^{2} (8.3 sq mi)

Population
  - Total: 68 (SAL 2021)
- Postcode: 6258
Localities around Dixvale
Yanmah	Yanmah	Yanmah
Yanmah	Dixvale	Ringbark
Glenoran	Deanmill	Deanmill

Dixvale is a rural locality of the Shire of Manjimup in the South West region of Western Australia. Dixvale is located on the traditional land of the Bibulman people of the Noongar nation. In the 2021 census, Dixvale had a population of 68 people.

== History ==
The local school was opened on 6 November 1922 and closed on 10 May 1946. Anthony Torrisi was the head teacher from 1934 to 1940, and was considered "the most popular school teacher Dixvale has ever had" in 1938. The school closure was part of a plan to close ten small schools and transfer students to larger ones, based on an assessment made in 1945 by John Tonkin, the Minister of Education, who stated that the road system was "reasonably sound" at the time.

In June 1936, an effort was being made to establish a scout troop within the region. By August it was well established. The troop met every Friday night.

== Demographics ==
In the 2016 census, Dixvale had a population of 55 people, 36% female and 64% male. The median age was 43 years, 5 years above the national median of 38.

In the 2021 census, Dixvale had a population of 68 people, 29% female and 71% male. The median age was 32 years, 6 years below the national median of 38.

== Heritage listings ==
Two heritage listed sites exist in the locality, the Tobacco Farm Group and the Glenview Tobacco Farm, both from a time when tobacco farming was an extensive enterprise in the Manjimup area.

The heritage listed Dixvale Hall, or Dix Vale Hall, is located in Balbarrup, to the east of Dixvale. It dates back to the 1920s and was constructed as part of the Group Settlement Scheme in the area.
