= Benjinup, Western Australia =

Locality in the Shire of Boyup Brook, Western Australia

Benjinup
- Suburb
- Coordinates: 33.79°S 116.30°E
- Country: Australia
- State: Western Australia
- LGA: Shire of Boyup Brook
- Location: 254 km (158 mi) from Perth; 90 km (56 mi) from Bunbury

Government
  - State electorate: Warren-Blackwood
  - Federal division: O'Connor

Area
  - Total: 284.8 km^{2} (110.0 sq mi)

Population
  - Total: 143 (SAL 2021)
- Postcode: 6255
Suburbs around Benjinup
Wilga West	Wilga	Dinninup
Catterick	Benjinup	Boyup Brook
Catterick	Winnejup	Boyup Brook

Benjinup is a rural locality of the Shire of Boyup Brook in the South West region of Western Australia.

Benjinup is located on the traditional land of the Kaneang people of the Noongar nation.

The name Benjinup is of Kaneang origin and means "to look out at the sun rising".

Benjinup was a stop on the Donnybrook–Katanning railway.
