= Catterick =

Catterick may refer to:

== Places ==
- Catterick, North Yorkshire, England, a village
- Catterick Bridge, a hamlet and bridge in North Yorkshire
- Catterick Bridge railway station, formerly in Brompton-on-Swale, North Yorkshire
- Catterick Garrison, British Army garrison near Catterick village in North Yorkshire
  - RAF Catterick, former Royal Air Force base in North Yorkshire
- Catterick, Western Australia, a locality in Western Australia

== People ==
- Harry Catterick (1919–1985), English football player and manager
- John Catterick (died 1419), English bishop

== Other ==
- Catterick, comedy show
