= Ringbark, Western Australia =

Locality in the Shire of Manjimup, Western Australia

Ringbark
- other
- Coordinates: 34.20668°S 116.11297°E
- Country: Australia
- State: Western Australia
- LGA(s): Shire of Manjimup
- Location: 251 km (156 mi) from Perth; 6 km (3.7 mi) from Manjimup

Government
  - State electorate(s): Warren-Blackwood
  - Federal division(s): O'Connor

Area
  - Total: 25.4 km^{2} (9.8 sq mi)

Population
  - Total(s): 110 (SAL 2021)
- Postcode: 6258
Localities around Ringbark
| Yanmah | Linfarne | Palgarup |
| Dixvale | Ringbark | Balbarrup |
| Deanmill | Deanmill | Manjimup |

Ringbark is a rural locality of the Shire of Manjimup in the South West region of Western Australia, with the South Western Highway forming the eastern border of the locality.

Ringbark is located on the traditional land of the Bibulman people of the Noongar nation.

The site of the former Tobacco Research Reserve, also called Manjimup Research Station No.1, and dating back to 1953, is registered on the shire's heritage list.
