= Malcolm Scott (politician) =

Australian politician

The Honourable Malcolm Scott
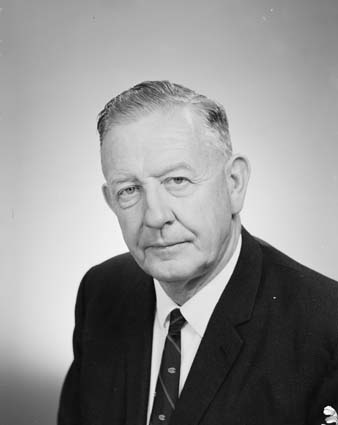

Minister for Customs and Excise
- In office 28 February 1968 – 12 November 1969
- Prime Minister: John Gorton
- Preceded by: Ken Anderson
- Succeeded by: Don Chipp

Senator for Western Australia
- In office 22 February 1950 – 30 June 1971

Personal details
- Born: 11 May 1911 Bridgetown, Western Australia, Australia
- Died: 31 May 1989 (aged 78) Booragoon, Western Australia, Australia
- Party: Liberal
- Spouse: Nancy Ozanne (m. 1936)

Malcolm Fox Scott (11 May 1911 – 31 May 1989) was an Australian politician who served as a Senator for Western Australia from 1950 to 1971, representing the Liberal Party. He served as a minister in the Gorton government from 1968 to 1969. Scott was a farmer before entering politics.

== Early life ==
Scott was born in Bridgetown, Western Australia, to Ada Margaretta (née Fox) and Thomas Scott. His father was an immigrant from Scotland. Scott was raised on his father's farm and began his education at the local state school. He went on to Bunbury High School for one year, and then boarded at Scotch College, Perth. After finishing school, Scott returned to Bridgetown to help run the family farm, and eventually took it over completely. He also had a share in a pastoral lease in the Kimberley, as well as interests in a pearling company that operated six luggers out of Broome. Scott was elected to the Bridgetown Road Board in 1939, and served as chairman from 1946 to 1950.

== Politics ==
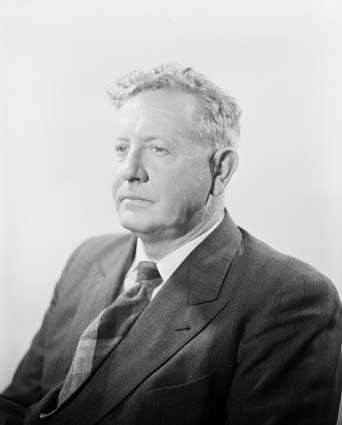
Scott in 1956.

Scott was briefly a member of the Labor Party in the 1940s. He left the party after Ben Chifley announced his intention to nationalise the banking sector, and subsequently joined the Liberal Party. Scott contested the preselection process for the Division of Forrest prior to the 1949 federal election, but lost to Gordon Freeth. He was instead endorsed as a senate candidate, and was elected in the fourth position on a combined Liberal–Country ticket. As a backbencher, Scott had a keen interest in national development, particularly in North-West Australia. He toured the region in 1958 with Robert Menzies and Bill Spooner, and was an advocate of the Ord River Scheme. Scott was a proponent of centralisation (an unpopular view amongst many of his constituents) and suggested that the Kimberley should be transferred from Western Australia to the Northern Territory so it could be under federal control.

In March 1966, Scott was made Government Whip in the Senate. He had shared offices with John Gorton early in his career, and supported his bid for the Liberal leadership after the death of Harold Holt. In February 1968, a month after Gorton became prime minister, Scott was made Minister for Customs and Excise in the new ministry. Among his duties was the censorship of imported literature and film, where he gained a reputation for puritanism. At one point, Scott had a scene cut from a Czechoslovak film, I Love, You Love, which depicted "a couple lying side-by-side with the husband stroking his wife's face and her pregnant belly". He said that these actions were of "a distinctly sexual nature".

Scott's career as a minister ended in November 1969, when he was replaced by Don Chipp in a reshuffle. He had been involved in two controversies the previous year, the first was over his shareholdings in mining companies. Because those companies were often involved in leasing government land, it was suggested that a conflict of interest might exist. The second controversy concerned the resignation of an officer of the Department of Customs and Excise (for which Scott was responsible). The officer had resigned after being found guilty of improper conduct, but subsequently received assistance in finding private-sector employment, which was said to be an abuse of power (and contradicted Scott's own statements on the "gravity" of the officer's offence).

== Later life ==
Scott lost Liberal preselection prior to the 1970 half-senate election, with his term ending in June 1971. He had considered running as an independent, but decided against doing so due to a pledge he had made not to oppose endorsed Liberal candidates. Scott had moved his family to Perth soon after entering the senate, and lived there in retirement (while still owning property in the country). He died at his home Booragoon in May 1989, aged 78. He had married Nancy Elizabeth Ozanne in 1936, with whom he had five children.

Political offices
Preceded by Ken Anderson	Minister for Customs and Excise; 1968–1969	Succeeded by Don Chipp
