= Linfarne, Western Australia =

Locality in the Shire of Manjimup, Western Australia

Linfarne
- other
- Coordinates: 34.16027°S 116.10591°E
- Country: Australia
- State: Western Australia
- LGA: Shire of Manjimup
- Location: 246 km (153 mi) from Perth; 10 km (6.2 mi) from Manjimup

Government
  - State electorate: Warren-Blackwood
  - Federal division: O'Connor

Area
  - Total: 31.5 km^{2} (12.2 sq mi)

Population
  - Total: 64 (SAL 2021)
- Postcode: 6258
Localities around Linfarne
Yornup	Yornup	Wilgarrup
Yanmah	Linfarne	Palgarup
Ringbark	Ringbark	Ringbark

Linfarne is a rural locality of the Shire of Manjimup in the South West region of Western Australia. Linfarne is located on the traditional land of the Bibulman people of the Noongar nation. In the 2021 census, Linfarne had a population of 64 people.

== History ==
Linfarne, originally called Linfarn, was established as part of the Group Settlement Scheme in the 1920s as part of Group 79 Settlement.

The locality once was the site of a small school that opened in February 1925; by 1944 it had 14 pupils. The last head teacher, Julia Lee, was assigned in 1942 and remained until its closure on 23 May 1947; approximately 10 students were transferred to Manjimup State School in June 1947 as part of the consolidation process. By 1949, the school building had been removed and the land of the former school was for sale.

In the early 1950s, the region had a very serious rabbit infestation due to "a number of neglected properties in the Linfarn and Yanmah areas". In June 1951, a number of residents were taken to court for failing to take "satisfactory steps" in poisoning their properties, after a community poisoning drive was ordered. By 1954, the rabbit infestation had not been resolved; with mandatory rabbit poisoning drives still occurring within the region.

== Demographics ==
In the 2016 census, Linfarne had a population of 63 people, 48% female and 52% male. The median age was 47 years, 9 years above the national median of 38.

In the 2021 census, Linfarne had a population of 64 people, 46% female and 54% male. The median age was 48 years, 10 years above the national median of 38.
