= Yanmah, Western Australia =

Locality in the Shire of Manjimup, Western Australia

Yanmah
- Town
- Coordinates: 34.183733°S 116.017482°E
- Country: Australia
- State: Western Australia
- LGA: Shire of Manjimup
- Location: 249 km (155 mi) from Perth; 13 km (8.1 mi) from Manjimup

Government
  - State electorate: Warren-Blackwood
  - Federal division: O'Connor

Area
  - Total: 80.9 km^{2} (31.2 sq mi)

Population
  - Total: 145 (SAL 2021)
- Postcode: 6258
Localities around Yanmah
Donnelly River	Yornup	Yornup
Glenoran	Yanmah	Linfarne
Glenoran	Glenoran	Dixvale

Yanmah is a rural locality and town of the Shire of Manjimup in the South West region of Western Australia. The Yanmah Brook flows through the locality, and the Yanmah State Forest is located in Yanmah.

Yanmah is located on the traditional land of the Bibulman people of the Noongar nation.

Yanmah was established as a service centre as part of the Group Settlement Scheme in 1922. Original naming suggestions were Janninup, the local indigenous name for the area, and Mitchelldean, after the premier of Western Australia at the time, but Yanmah was chosen instead, meaning "go ahead" or "go quickly". The townsite of Yanmah was gazetted in January 1923. The school was opened in 1922 and closed in 1954.

The town and the Group Settlement were not a success, and little of it now remains. Almost its only feature, the heritage listed Glenoran Hall, a community hall, was relocated to Yanmah, a common fate for timber buildings at the time, and is now in private ownership.
