= List of State Register of Heritage Places in the Shire of Nannup =

The State Register of Heritage Places is maintained by the Heritage Council of Western Australia. As of 2026, 89 places are heritage-listed in the Shire of Nannup, of which three are on the State Register of Heritage Places.

== List ==
The Western Australian State Register of Heritage Places, as of 2026, lists the following three state registered places within the Shire of Nannup:

Place name	Place #	Location	Suburb or town	Co-ordinates	Built	State registered	Notes	Photo
Donnelly River Mill	2966	Donnelly River, Corner Andrew & Sears Road	Donnelly River	34°06′06″S 115°58′39″E	1949	9 February 1996	The mostly intact mill is the only extant example which utilised steam power-technology in working the hardwood forests of the Western Australia	
Donnelly River Mill & Townsite Precinct	8198	Donnelly River, Corner Andrew & Sears Road	Donnelly River	34°06′06″S 115°58′39″E	1951	1 June 2007	Workers’ Cottages, now used as tourist accommodation	
Jalbarragup Bridge (ruin)	3364	Jalbarragup Road, on the Blackwood River	Jalbarragup	34°02′30″S 115°36′10″E	1900	2 June 1998	The only remaining turn of the century wooden bridge over the Blackwood River surviving in its original form, and one of few such bridges left in Western Australia	
