= Shire of Bridgetown =

Former local government area in Western Australia

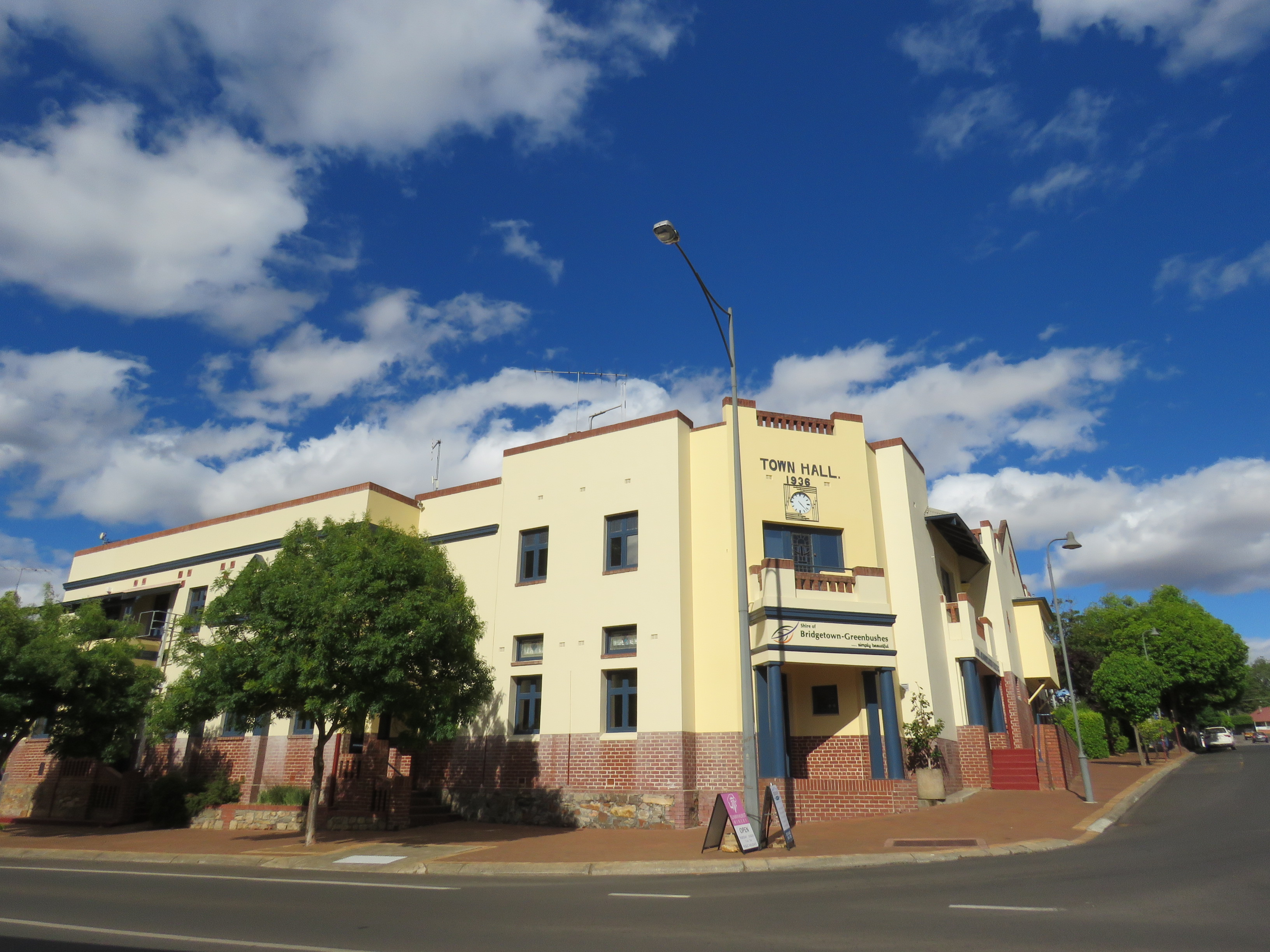
The Shire of Bridgetown-Greenbushes Admin Building

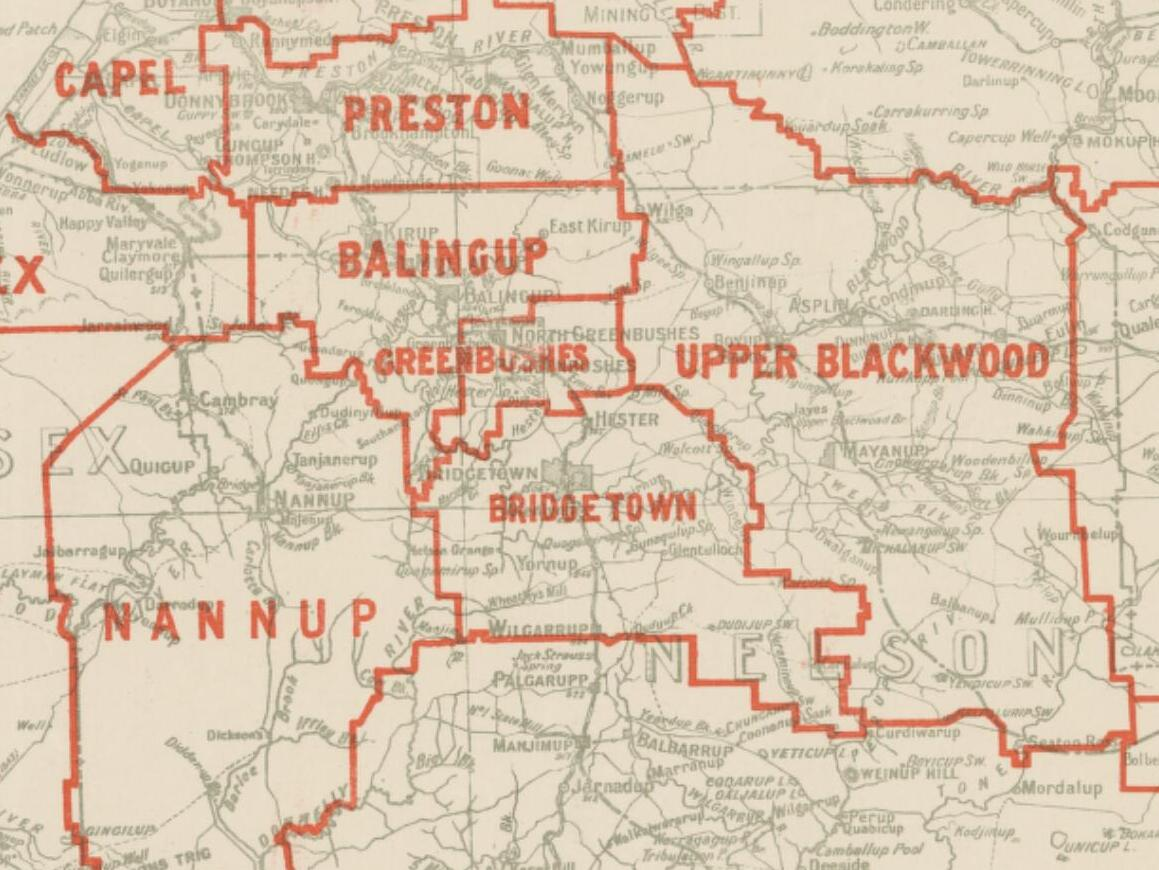
Bridgetown and surrounding road districts, 1935

The Shire of Bridgetown was a local government area in Western Australia. It was established as the Nelson Road District on 10 February 1887, with the board seat in Bridgetown.

In 1936, the road board built the now heritage-listed Bridgetown Town Hall, which contained their new headquarters.

It was renamed the Bridgetown Road District on 4 May 1917. It was declared a shire and named the Shire of Bridgetown with effect from 1 July 1961 following the passage of the Local Government Act 1960, which reformed all remaining road districts into shires.

The shire ceased to exist on 26 March 1970, when it amalgamated with the Shire of Greenbushes to form the Shire of Bridgetown-Greenbushes.

Former Senator Malcolm Scott and state parliamentarians Francis Drake Willmott and John Henry Smith were members of the Bridgetown Road Board before their elections to parliament, with Scott and Smith both serving as chairman.
