= Catterick, Western Australia =

Locality in the Shire of Bridgetown–Greenbushes, Western Australia

Catterick
- Suburb
- Coordinates: 33.83°S 116.15°E
- Country: Australia
- State: Western Australia
- LGA: Shire of Bridgetown–Greenbushes
- Location: 252 km (157 mi) from Perth; 88 km (55 mi) from Bunbury; 15 km (9.3 mi) from Bridgetown

Government
  - State electorate: Warren-Blackwood
  - Federal division: O'Connor

Area
  - Total: 125.5 km^{2} (48.5 sq mi)

Population
  - Total: 171 (SAL 2021)
- Postcode: 6255
Suburbs around Catterick
North Greenbushes	Wilga West	Benjinup
Greenbushes	Catterick	Benjinup
Hester Brook	Hester	Winnejup

Catterick is a rural locality of the Shire of Bridgetown–Greenbushes in the South West region of Western Australia.

It is on the traditional land of the Noongar people.

Catterick was a siding on the Picton to Northcliffe railway, originally named Yandil until renamed in 1924.
