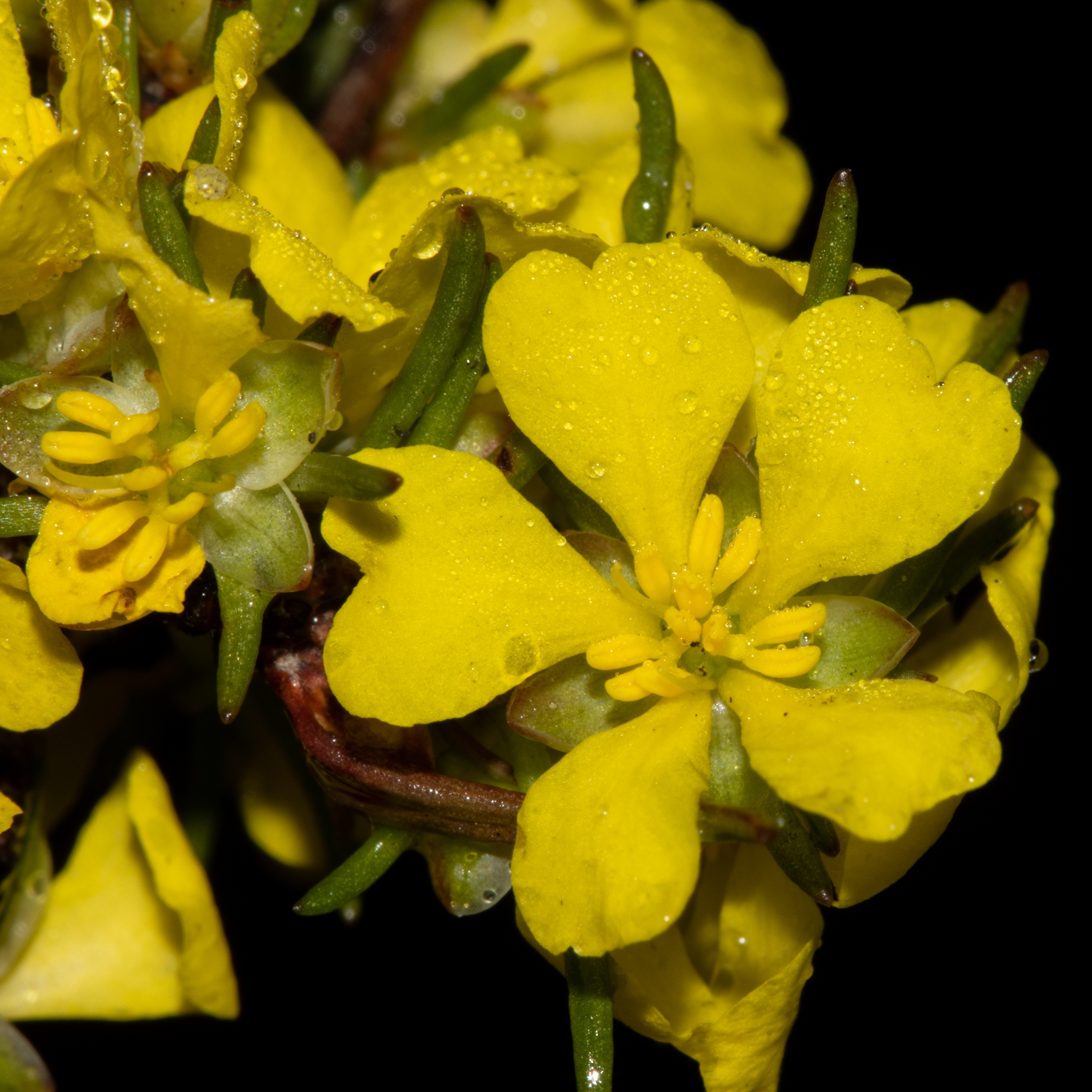
- Hibbertia pulchra

Scientific classification
- Kingdom: Plantae
- Clade: Embryophytes
- Clade: Tracheophytes
- Clade: Spermatophytes
- Clade: Angiosperms
- Clade: Eudicots
- Order: Dilleniales
- Family: Dilleniaceae
- Genus: Hibbertia
- Species: H. pulchra

Binomial name
- Hibbertia pulchra Ostenf.

= Hibbertia pulchra =

Species of flowering plant

Hibbertia pulchra is a species of flowering plant in the family Dilleniaceae and is endemic to the south-west of Western Australia. It is a multi-stemmed shrub with clustered, linear to narrow egg-shaped leaves with the narrower end towards the base, and yellow flowers with eleven stamens arranged around three carpels.

== Description ==
Hibbertia pulchra is a sprawling, multi-stemmed shrub that typically grows to a height of up to 60 cm (24 in). Its leaves are arranged in clusters, sometimes near the ends of the stems, and are linear to narrow egg-shaped with the narrower end towards the base, 5–25 mm (0.20–0.98 in) long, 0.5–1.5 mm (0.020–0.059 in) wide and glabrous. The flowers are arranged singly in leaf axils or on the ends of short side shoots, sessile and 8–15 mm (0.31–0.59 in) in diameter with egg-shaped bracts 1.5–3 mm (0.059–0.118 in) long at the base. The five sepals are broadly elliptic, 4–7 mm (0.16–0.28 in) long and joined at the base, the outer lobes 3–4 mm (0.12–0.16 in) long and 2.5–3.5 mm (0.098–0.138 in) wide, the inner lobes longer and broader. The five petals are yellow, egg-shaped with the narrower end towards the base and 4–9 mm (0.16–0.35 in) long with a notch at the tip. There are eleven stamens joined in three groups of three with two free, arranged around the three carpels that each contain a single ovule. Flowering mostly occurs from July to November.

== Taxonomy ==
Hibbertia pulchra was first formally described in 1921 by Carl Hansen Ostenfeld in the journal Biologiske meddelelser, Kongelige Danske Videnskabernes Selskab from specimens collected near Palgarup in 1914. The specific epithet (pulchra) means "beautiful".

In 2004, Judith R. Wheeler described three varieties of H. pulchra in the journal Nuytsia and the names are accepted by the Australian Plant Census:

- Hibbertia pulchra var. acutibractea J.R.Wheeler that has egg-shaped to elliptic bracts 1.0–1.3 mm (0.039–0.051 in) wide;
- Hibbertia pulchra var. crassinervia J.R.Wheeler has inconspicuous bracts 0.5–1.5 mm (0.020–0.059 in) long;
- Hibbertia pulchra Ostenf. var. pulchra has more or less circular bracts 2–3 mm (0.079–0.118 in) wide.

== Distribution and habitat ==
This hibbertia grows in a variety of habitats including shrubland, woodland and forest between Collie, Capel, Lake Muir and Albany in the Avon Wheatbelt, Esperance Plains, Jarrah Forest, Swan Coastal Plain and Warren biogeographic regions of south-western Western Australia.

== Conservation status ==
Hibbertia pulchra and each of its three varieties are classified as "not threatened" by the Western Australian Government Department of Biodiversity, Conservation and Attractions.

== See also ==
- List of Hibbertia species
