= Kingston, Western Australia =

Locality in the Shire of Bridgetown-Greenbushes, Western Australia

Kingston
- Suburb
- Coordinates: 34.12°S 116.36°E
- Country: Australia
- State: Western Australia
- LGA: Shire of Bridgetown–Greenbushes
- Location: 293 km (182 mi) from Perth; 128 km (80 mi) from Bunbury; 34 km (21 mi) from Bridgetown

Government
  - State electorate: Warren-Blackwood
  - Federal division: O'Connor

Area
  - Total: 312.8 km^{2} (120.8 sq mi)

Population
  - Total: 16 (SAL 2021)
- Postcode: 6256
Suburbs around Kingston
Sunnyside	Winnejup	Mayanup
Yornup	Kingston	Chowerup
Balbarrup	Perub	Perub

Kingston is a rural locality of the Shire of Bridgetown–Greenbushes in the South West region of Western Australia. The locality is predominantly forested, with the Greater Kingston National Park in the east and the Palgarup State Forest in the south.

It is on the traditional land of the Noongar people.
