= Deanmill, Western Australia =

Deanmill
- Town
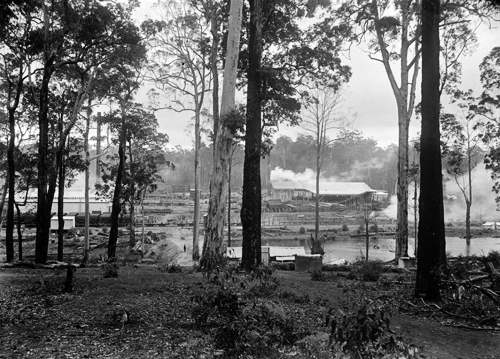
- 1920s photo of the Number 1 sawmill

- Coordinates: 34.26°S 116.07°E
- Country: Australia
- State: Western Australia
- LGA(s): Shire of Manjimup
- Location: 5 km (3.1 mi) from Manjimup
- Established: 1914

Government
  - State electorate(s): Warren-Blackwood
  - Federal division(s): O'Connor

Area
  - Total: 28.8 km^{2} (11.1 sq mi)

Population
  - Total(s): 327 (SAL 2021)
- Postcode: 6258
Localities around Deanmill
Dixvale	Ringbark	Ringbark
Glenoran	Deanmill	Manjimup
Glenoran	Jardee	Jardee

Deanmill is a historic timber town located in the South West region of Western Australia, near Manjimup. Its postcode is 6258.

== History ==
After the Government Trading Concerns Act 1912 was passed in December of that year, several State-operated businesses were established. One of these was State Saw Mills, which commenced with purchasing the South-West Timber Hewers' Co-operative for £80,000. Construction on the State's Number 1 sawmill, later called Deanmill, began in 1913, as did construction of the Number 2 and 3 mills at Big Brook, later called Pemberton. The mills cost an estimated £138,000, and were to provide timber railway sleepers for the Trans-Australian Railway. Construction of the mills was delayed by heavy rainfall, and the railway sleepers were delivered late. Other problems included shipping disputes and the Commonwealth government's price for sleepers.

State Saw Mills created a township surrounding the Number 1 mill, called Deanmill after a construction engineer named A. Dean. They followed accepted practice at the time of placing a timber mill in a valley with accommodation and other facilities close by. Deanmill Primary School was built in 1914 by the Public Works Department in association with State Saw Mills. The school initially consisted of a single classroom, administration building and shed, all constructed out of timber.

== Today ==
Deanmill currently consists of the sawmill, mill houses, the Deanmill Workers' Club, the Deanmill Football Oval and part of the Deanmill Tramway and Heritage Trail.

Premier Geoff Gallop visited Deanmill in December 2002 when the State government was compiling its Forest Management Plan, to start in 2004. The Government entered into negotiations with Sotico to provide a guaranteed volume of jarrah sawlogs over 10 years, to maintain the timber industry in the area. Sotico was a subsidiary of Wesfarmers, which sold the company in 2004.

Several assessments have been made regarding the environmental impact of the sawmill and associated activities. A 2004 assessment by Wesfarmers showed arsenic contamination in and surrounding a drainage channel to Lefroy Brook. The WA government accepted responsibility for the issue, as State Saw Mills used arsenic to treat timber in the 1920s. Wesfarmers accepted responsibility for groundwater and soil contamination with creosote, and the clean-up cost was shared by Wesfarmers and the State government.

== Demographics ==
The rural district which includes Deanmill had 405 residents as of the 2006 Census, 50.4% males and 49.6% females. The median age of persons in Deanmill was 39 years old, and 90.9% of residents were Australian citizens. The most common answers for occupation included labourers (27.4%), managers (18.4%), technicians and trades workers (12.4%), professionals (10.9%) and sales workers (9.5%), and the most common industries were log sawmilling and timber dressing (16.4%), school education (9.0%), growing of fruit and tree nuts (8.5%), farming of sheep, cattle and grain (4.0%) and State Government administration (3.5%). The median weekly household income was $821, compared with the Australian average of $1,027.
