= Adelaide Timber Company =

- Company type: Private
- Industry: Timber
- Founder: George Shepherdson
- Area served: Western Australia

The Adelaide Timber Company was a company that operated timber mills in Western Australia.

== History ==
In 1894, George Shepherdson moved to Western Australia having milled timber near Adelaide, establishing a mill near Mundaring. He returned to South Australia in 1895 leaving the business in the hands of his sons.

In January 1898, the business was incorporated as Adelaide Timber Company Limited. In 1899, the Mundaring mill closed with operations to a site near Greenbushes. In 1908, the Adelaide Timber Company moved to new concession near Wilga on the Donnybrook to Boyup Brook railway line.

In 1929, WA Jarrah Forests' mill in East Witchcliffe was purchased.
