= Tom O'Dwyer =

Australian cricketer (1919–2005)

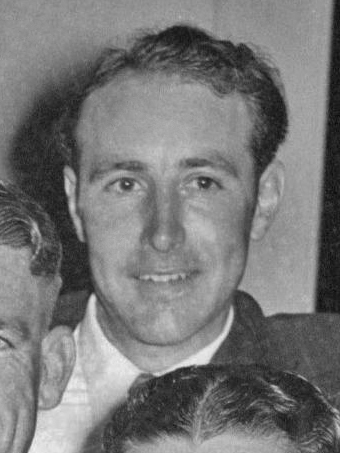
- O'Dwyer in 1948

Personal information
- Full name: Thomas Edmund O'Dwyer
- Born: 5 November 1919; Bridgetown, Western Australia
- Died: 1 September 2005 (aged 85); Perth, Western Australia
- Nickname: The Bowling Baritone
- Batting: Left-handed
- Bowling: Slow left-arm orthodox
- Role: Bowler

Domestic team information
- Years: Team
- 1946/47–1959/60: Western Australia

Career statistics
| Competition | First-class |
|---|---|
| Matches | 15 |
| Runs scored | 305 |
| Batting average | 16.05 |
| 100s/50s | 0/1 |
| Top score | 51 |
| Balls bowled | 2,966 |
| Wickets | 41 |
| Bowling average | 34.51 |
| 5 wickets in innings | 3 |
| 10 wickets in match | 0 |
| Best bowling | 7/79 |
| Catches/stumpings | 8/– |
- Source: CricketArchive, 8 November 2011

Thomas Edmund O'Dwyer (5 November 1919 – 1 September 2005) was an Australian cricketer who played 15 first-class matches for Western Australia between 1946 and 1960. He is best known as the last player to dismiss Donald Bradman in a first-class match in Australia. O'Dwyer was born in Bridgetown, Western Australia, to John and Isabel (née Priest) O'Dwyer. His father was manager of the local Lands Department office. O'Dwyer's family moved to Perth when he was five, and he attended St. Patrick's College (now part of Trinity College). He began playing cricket with the North Perth C-grade team, and later played for Subiaco and Mount Lawley in the WACA District competition.

Bowling left-arm orthodox spin, O'Dwyer made his first-class debut for Western Australia against the touring Marylebone Cricket Club team in October 1946, and took two wickets on debut, dismissing Joe Hardstaff leg before wicket and having Bill Edrich caught. The following season, he was a member of Western Australia's inaugural Sheffield Shield side against South Australia, taking 5/47 in South Australia's first innings to record his first five-wicket haul. Later in the 1947–48 season, the Australian side touring England stopped in Perth and played a match against Western Australia, with O'Dwyer becoming the last bowler to dismiss Don Bradman in a first-class match in Australia, having him caught by Tom Outridge.

O'Dwyer retired at the conclusion of the 1960 season to concentrate on his work, having played a total of 15 first-class matches, in which he scored 305 runs at an average of 16.05, and took 41 wickets at an average of 34.51. His best bowling figures were taken against Queensland in February 1948, taken seven wickets for 79 runs in Queensland's first innings. Outside of cricket, O'Dwyer worked in the insurance business, and was also involved with the Roman Catholic Church and the Society of Saint Vincent de Paul. He died in Perth in September 2005.
