= North Greenbushes, Western Australia =

Locality in the Shire of Bridgetown-Greenbushes, Western Australia

North Greenbushes
- Town
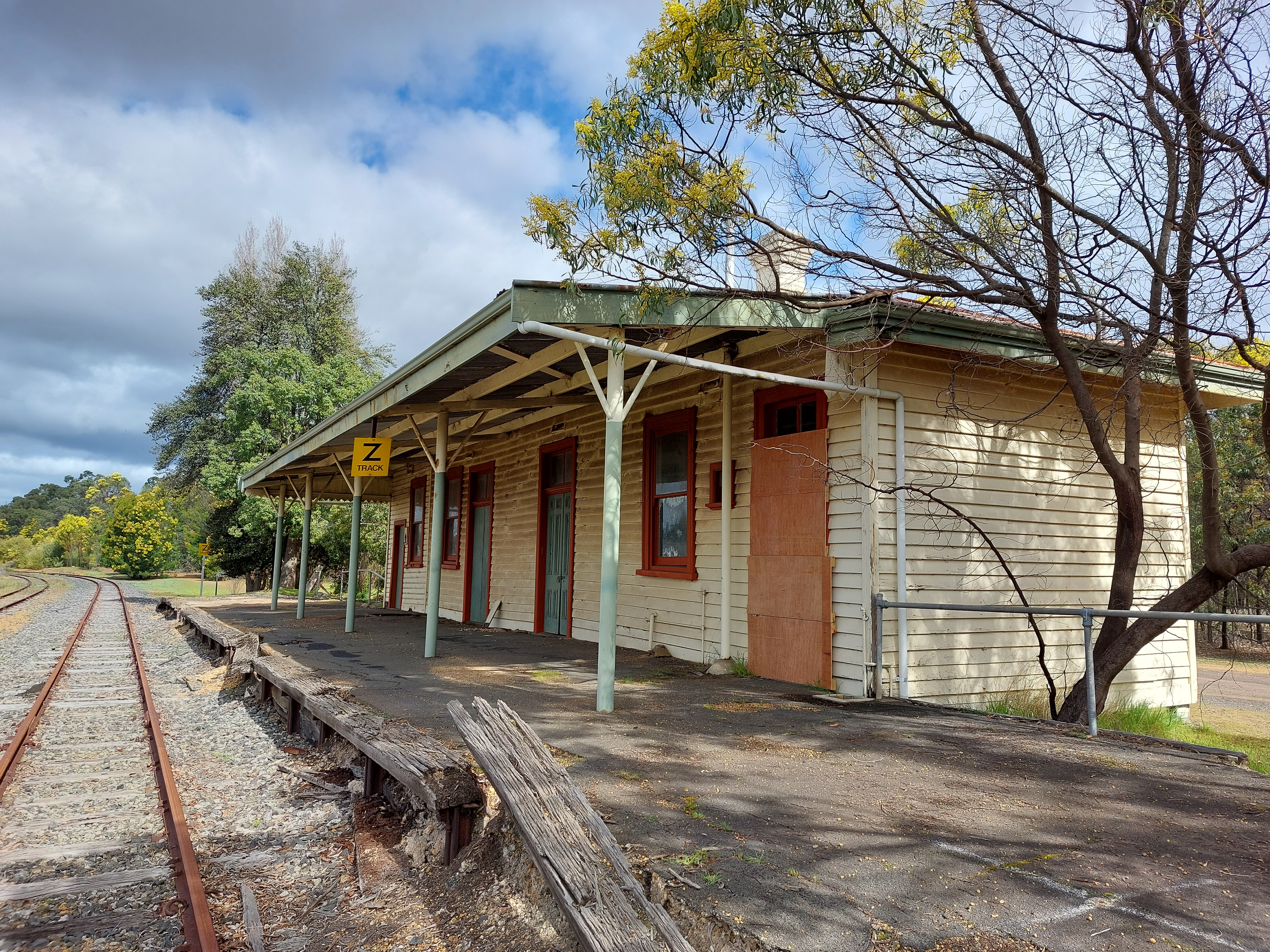
- The heritage-listed Greenbushes Railway Station
- Coordinates: 33.82°S 116.06°E
- Country: Australia
- State: Western Australia
- LGA: Shire of Bridgetown–Greenbushes
- Location: 242 km (150 mi) from Perth; 79 km (49 mi) from Bunbury; 20 km (12 mi) from Bridgetown

Government
  - State electorate: Warren-Blackwood
  - Federal division: O'Connor

Area
  - Total: 18.5 km^{2} (7.1 sq mi)

Population
  - Total: 174 (SAL 2021)
- Postcode: 6254
Localities around North Greenbushes
Balingup	Balingup	Catterick
Greenbushes	North Greenbushes	Catterick
Greenbushes	Greenbushes	Catterick

North Greenbushes is a rural locality and small town of the Shire of Bridgetown–Greenbushes in the South West region of Western Australia.

It is on the traditional land of the Noongar people.

Tin was discovered around Greenbushes in 1888, which led to the development of the area as a mining location. In 1898, a train station was opened in North Greenbushes on the Donnybrook to Bridgetown railway, originally just named Greenbushes. A town was subsequently gazetted three kilometres to the south the following year; it received the name Greenbushes, resulting in the location of the railway station being renamed to North Greenbushes.

The Greenbushes Railway Station, opened in October 1898 as a station for both passengers and goods, is heritage-listed but no longer in use, passenger services on the line having been suspended in 1985. The other buildings at the site, the goods shed and station master's house, have been demolished or destroyed by fire.
