= Bridgetown High School =

Location
- Bridgetown, South West region, Western Australia; Australia; 33°57′36″S 116°08′32″E

Information
- Type: Public co-educational high day school
- Motto: seek the best
- Established: 1954; 72 years ago
- Educational authority: WA Department of Education
- Principal: Carol Thorsby
- Enrolment: 168 (2024)
- Campus type: Regional
- Colours: Maroon, gold and blue
- Website: www.bridgetownhs.wa.edu.au

Bridgetown High School is a comprehensive public co-educational middle day school, located in Bridgetown, a regional centre in the South West region, 270 kilometres (168 mi) south of Perth, Western Australia.

The school was established in 1954 as a high school catering for students from Year 7 to Year 10, and students who are to complete Year 11 and 12 travel to Manjimup Senior High School.

Enrolments at the school were 138 in 2007, 151 in 2008, 155 in 2009, 133 in 2010, 125 in 2011 and 119 in 2012.

== See also ==
- List of schools in rural Western Australia
