= Freemasons Hotel, Bridgetown =

Freemasons Hotel
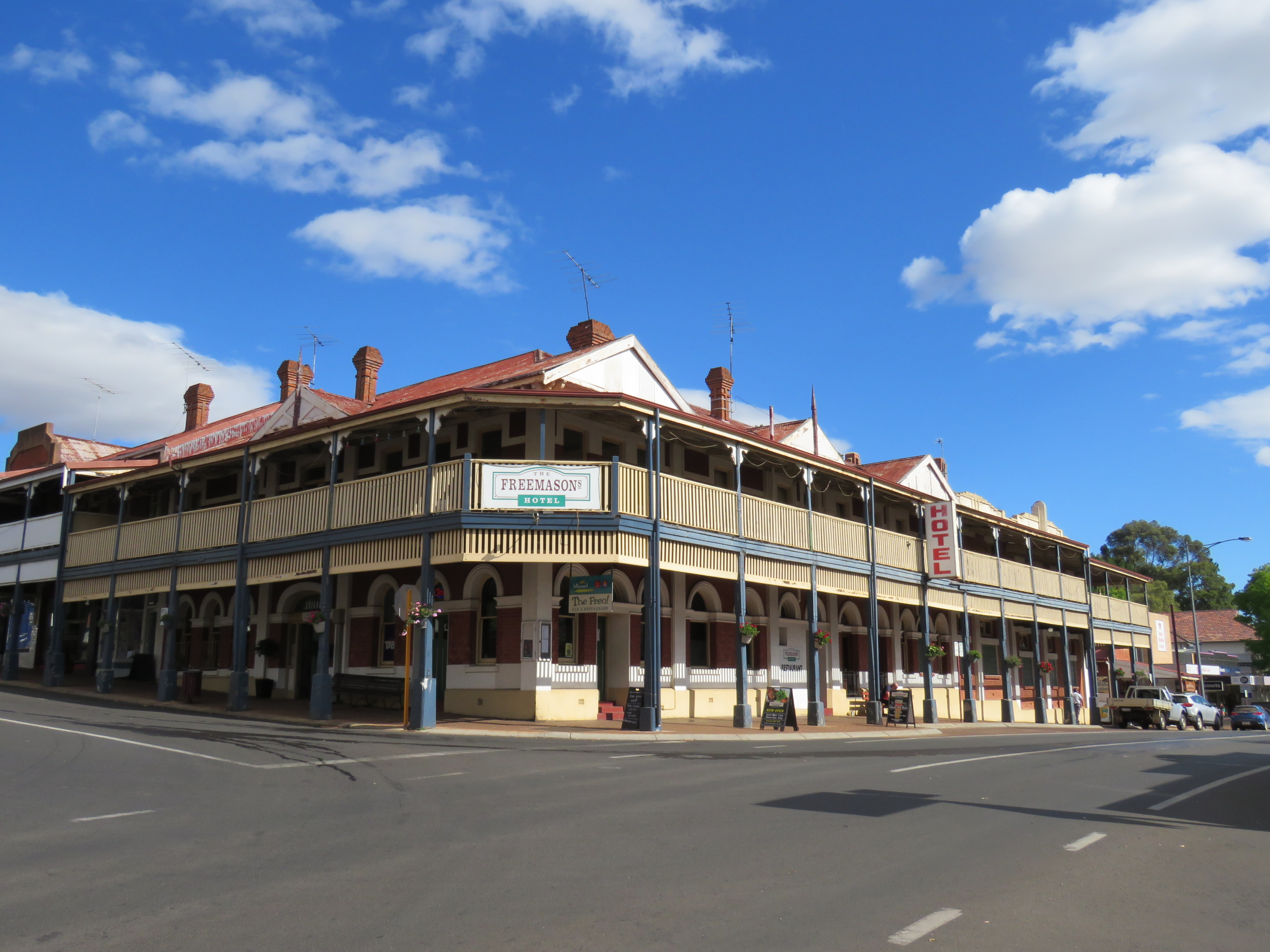
- The Freemasons Hotel in January 2022

- Location within Western Australia

General information
- Type: Australian pub
- Location: Bridgetown, Western Australia
- Coordinates: 33.9583°S 116.1373°E

Western Australia Heritage Register
- Designated: 9 February 1996
- Reference no.: 248

The Freemasons Hotel is a heritage-listed hotel in Bridgetown, Western Australia. It is located at 2 Steere Street, on the corner of Hampton Street (South Western Highway).

== History ==
The first Freemasons Hotel in Bridgetown was originally known as the Warner Hotel, located at the corner of Hampton Street and Phillips Street. A provisional hotel licence for the site was granted to Frederick Stanforth Warner in 1898. It was likely partially built by 1899, when it was listed for sale. The hotel opened in July 1900, with Warner as the proprietor. In November 1901 the Governor Sir Arthur Lawley, visiting for the Nelson Agricultural Show, renamed it the Freemasons Hotel. The hotel was taken over by P. Diprose c. 1900, followed shortly by Robert Arthur John Crawford in 1902. By 1903 Bunning Bros owned the hotel.

The hotel had low patronage due to its distance from the town centre, and the recently constructed Bridgetown railway station. Robert Bunning purchased a lot of land at the corner of Hampton Street and Steere Street, in the centre of Bridgetown opposite the Mechanics' Institutes.

In 1902, Diprose wanted to transfer the hotel licence to a proposed new building at Hampton Street and Steere Street, but the licence transfer was denied. Plans for the new hotel were available by May 1903, but a licence for the site was also denied in June 1903.

By March 1904 the new hotel was under construction by Bunning Bros. The Freemason Hotel's licence was transferred to the new building in 1904, with the old building left vacant. An opening dinner was held at the new Freemasons Hotel on 4 November, and on 14 March 1905 the hotel was let to Elizabeth Hurst for a ten-year term. Further construction works were completed by late 1906, adding two shop fronts on Steere Street with extra accommodation above them.

In 1939 the hotel was extended down Hampton Street, and renovated throughout. In 1992, there were internal alterations made. Plans by L. M. Whitney show removal and reconfiguration of brick wall, including the removal of a fireplace, as well as upgrade to the kitchen, preparation room, and toilet facilities. Further changes were proposed in 2002 in plans by architect D. Singe, to create a liquor store in the hotel, and to add an alfresco dining area to the existing bar. The hotel closed in January 2004, in preparation for the proposed renovations.

In 2013, a $86,136 grant from the State Heritage Commission was awarded, covering half of the cost of replacing the roof. A section of the verandah's support, balcony timbers, and balustrading were damaged in January 2017 by a truck crash, and were replaced later that year.
