= Witchcliffe, Western Australia =

Witchcliffe
- Town
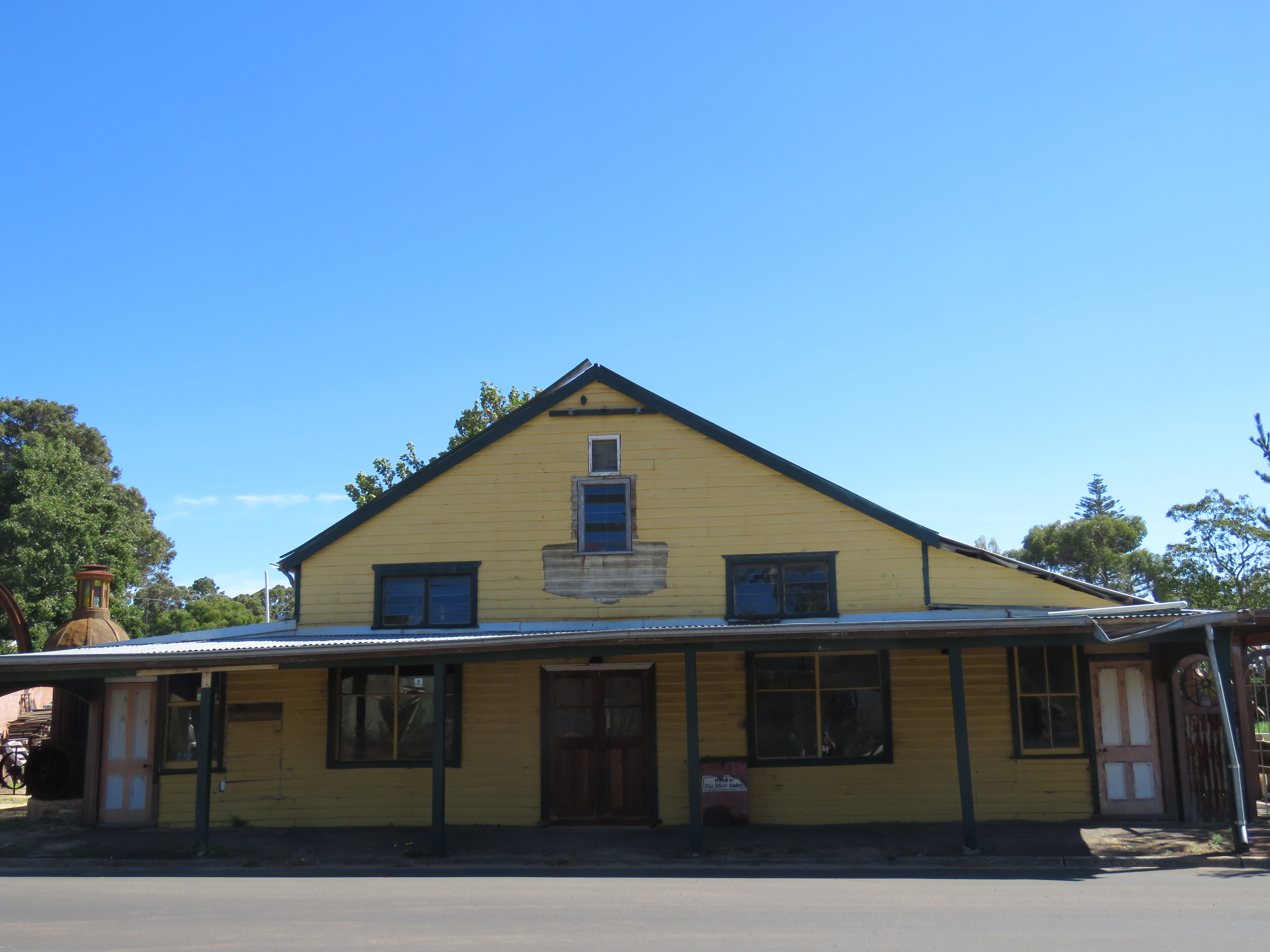
- The heritage listed former Darnell's General Store in Witchcliffe in 2021

- Interactive map of Witchcliffe
- Coordinates: 34.03°S 115.1°E
- Country: Australia
- State: Western Australia
- LGA: Shire of Augusta-Margaret River
- Location: 286 km (178 mi) south of Perth; 9 km (5.6 mi) south of Margaret River; 41 km (25 mi) north of Augusta
- Established: 1926

Government
  - State electorate: Warren-Blackwood
  - Federal division: Forrest

Area
  - Total: 54.7 km^{2} (21.1 sq mi)
- Elevation: 89 m (292 ft)

Population
  - Total: 484 (SAL 2021)
- Postcode: 6286

Witchcliffe is a small town in the South West region of Western Australia, located a few kilometres south of Margaret River on the Bussell Highway. The name originates from a cave in the area, Witchcliffe cave, that was recorded by a surveyor in 1900. It is believed the name was given by the Bussell family whose property, Wallcliffe, was established in the area in the 1850s.

== History ==
In 1924 the government extended the Flinders Bay railway line to Witchcliffe. The siding was to be named Narawary but a post office already existed at the site with the name Witchcliffe, having opened in 1923, so the siding was named Witchcliffe in 1925. Lots were surveyed and sold along the siding in 1924 and the townsite was gazetted in 1926.

The town was built around the timber industry, with the Witchcliffe sawmill being built in 1922 just east of town for the WA Jarrah Forests, which was taken over by the Adelaide Timber Company in 1929.

== Climate ==
Climate data for Witchcliffe (1999-2021)
Month	Jan	Feb	Mar	Apr	May	Jun	Jul	Aug	Sep	Oct	Nov	Dec	Year
Record high °C (°F)	40.6 (105.1)	39.6 (103.3)	39.0 (102.2)	32.6 (90.7)	27.7 (81.9)	22.5 (72.5)	21.2 (70.2)	22.8 (73.0)	26.8 (80.2)	32.4 (90.3)	36.2 (97.2)	40.6 (105.1)	40.6 (105.1)
Mean maximum °C (°F)	35.7 (96.3)	35.4 (95.7)	35.2 (95.4)	29.1 (84.4)	24.4 (75.9)	21.0 (69.8)	19.8 (67.6)	20.4 (68.7)	22.6 (72.7)	27.5 (81.5)	31.7 (89.1)	34.9 (94.8)	38.0 (100.4)
Mean daily maximum °C (°F)	26.6 (79.9)	27.1 (80.8)	25.6 (78.1)	22.5 (72.5)	19.7 (67.5)	17.5 (63.5)	16.4 (61.5)	16.8 (62.2)	17.5 (63.5)	19.7 (67.5)	22.8 (73.0)	24.9 (76.8)	21.4 (70.6)
Daily mean °C (°F)	20.3 (68.5)	20.8 (69.4)	19.5 (67.1)	16.9 (62.4)	14.8 (58.6)	13.2 (55.8)	12.3 (54.1)	12.5 (54.5)	13.1 (55.6)	14.6 (58.3)	16.9 (62.4)	18.7 (65.7)	16.1 (61.0)
Mean daily minimum °C (°F)	13.9 (57.0)	14.4 (57.9)	13.3 (55.9)	11.3 (52.3)	9.8 (49.6)	8.9 (48.0)	8.2 (46.8)	8.2 (46.8)	8.6 (47.5)	9.4 (48.9)	10.9 (51.6)	12.4 (54.3)	10.8 (51.4)
Mean minimum °C (°F)	7.9 (46.2)	8.5 (47.3)	6.9 (44.4)	5.2 (41.4)	3.5 (38.3)	2.6 (36.7)	1.9 (35.4)	2.5 (36.5)	3.2 (37.8)	4.3 (39.7)	5.6 (42.1)	6.5 (43.7)	0.8 (33.4)
Record low °C (°F)	4.5 (40.1)	5.5 (41.9)	3.2 (37.8)	3.0 (37.4)	−1.5 (29.3)	−0.7 (30.7)	−1.0 (30.2)	0.5 (32.9)	1.1 (34.0)	2.4 (36.3)	3.4 (38.1)	4.0 (39.2)	−1.5 (29.3)
Average precipitation mm (inches)	12.3 (0.48)	12.2 (0.48)	27.8 (1.09)	62.6 (2.46)	132.3 (5.21)	179.7 (7.07)	194.1 (7.64)	157.7 (6.21)	108.7 (4.28)	63.8 (2.51)	34.7 (1.37)	17.9 (0.70)	1,003.8 (39.5)
Average precipitation days	4.0	5.1	8.1	14.3	19.0	21.1	23.5	22.6	19.9	16.7	10.3	7.1	171.7
Average relative humidity (%)	50	48	50	57	62	67	67	65	64	61	55	52	58
Average dew point °C (°F)	12.3 (54.1)	12.6 (54.7)	11.8 (53.2)	11.4 (52.5)	10.7 (51.3)	9.6 (49.3)	8.7 (47.7)	8.3 (46.9)	8.6 (47.5)	9.4 (48.9)	10.6 (51.1)	11.4 (52.5)	10.5 (50.8)
