= Wilga, Western Australia =

Wilga
- Town
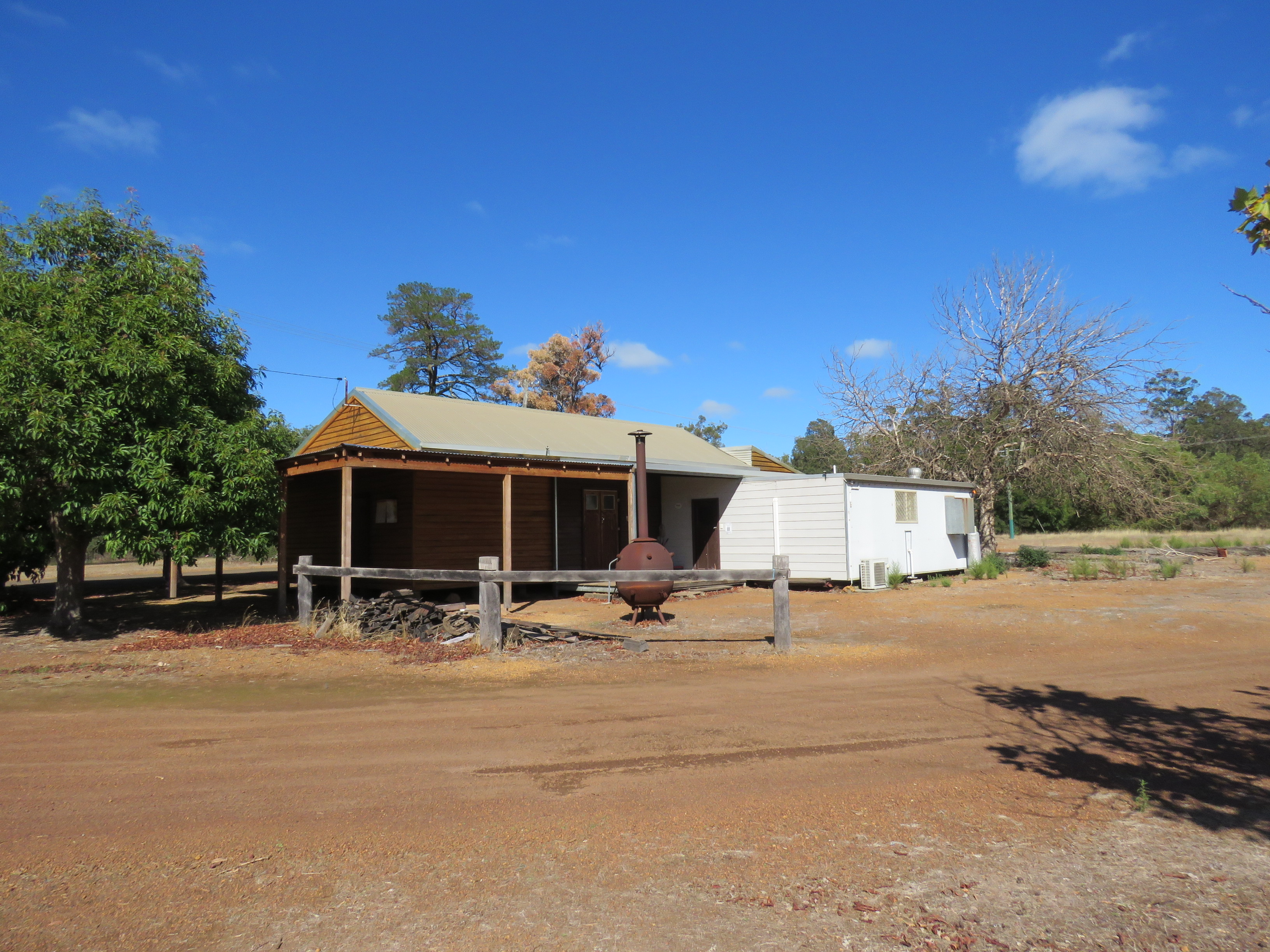
- The Wilga community hall in April 2022

- Coordinates: 33°42′S 116°14′E
- Country: Australia
- State: Western Australia
- LGA(s): Shire of Boyup Brook
- Location: 250 km (160 mi) SSW of Perth; 25 km (16 mi) NW of Boyup Brook
- Established: 1915

Government
  - State electorate(s): Warren-Blackwood
  - Federal division(s): O'Connor

Area
  - Total: 62.8 km^{2} (24.2 sq mi)
- Elevation: 286 m (938 ft)

Population
  - Total(s): 71 (SAL 2021)
- Postcode: 6243

Wilga is a small town located between Donnybrook and Boyup Brook in the South West region of Western Australia.

A railway between Donnybrook and Boyup Brook was opened in 1908 with Wilga originating as a railway siding. Built to serve the Adelaide Timber Company the forested area around the town was felled and sent to nearby mills. Land was set aside for a town in 1912 and later surveyed. The town was gazetted in 1915.

The name of the town is thought to have come from the nearby Wilgee Springs which first appeared on maps of the area in 1894. The name Wilgee is Aboriginal in origin and means ochre or pigment that is worn in ceremonies. The nearest saw mill was established in 1925 about 10 km from town and was named Woop Woop.

The Wilga Mill and its surrounds was considered to contain relics of the mill, locomotives and logging were scattered around it. It was removed and sold for scrap in 1984.
