= Palgarup, Western Australia =

Palgarup
- Town
- Coordinates: 34°10′26″S 116°10′30″E
- Country: Australia
- State: Western Australia
- LGA(s): Shire of Manjimup

Government
  - State electorate(s): Warren-Blackwood
  - Federal division(s): O'Connor

Area
  - Total: 27.4 km^{2} (10.6 sq mi)

Population
  - Total(s): 145 (SAL 2021)
- Time zone: UTC+8 (AWST)
- Postcode: 6258
Localities around Palgarup
Linfarne	Wilgarrup	Wilgarrup
Linfarne	Palgarup	Balbarrup
Ringbark	Balbarrup	Balbarrup

Palgarup is a rural locality of the Shire of Manjimup in the South West region of Western Australia, on the South Western Highway. At the 2021 census, Palgarup had a total population of 145.

Palgarup was the location of timber mills in the 1920s and 1930s.

== Transport ==
Palgarap was a stop on the Northcliffe railway line.
