= Shire of Bridgetown–Greenbushes =

Coordinates: 33°57′29″S 116°08′28″E

Shire of Bridgetown Greenbushes
- Local government area
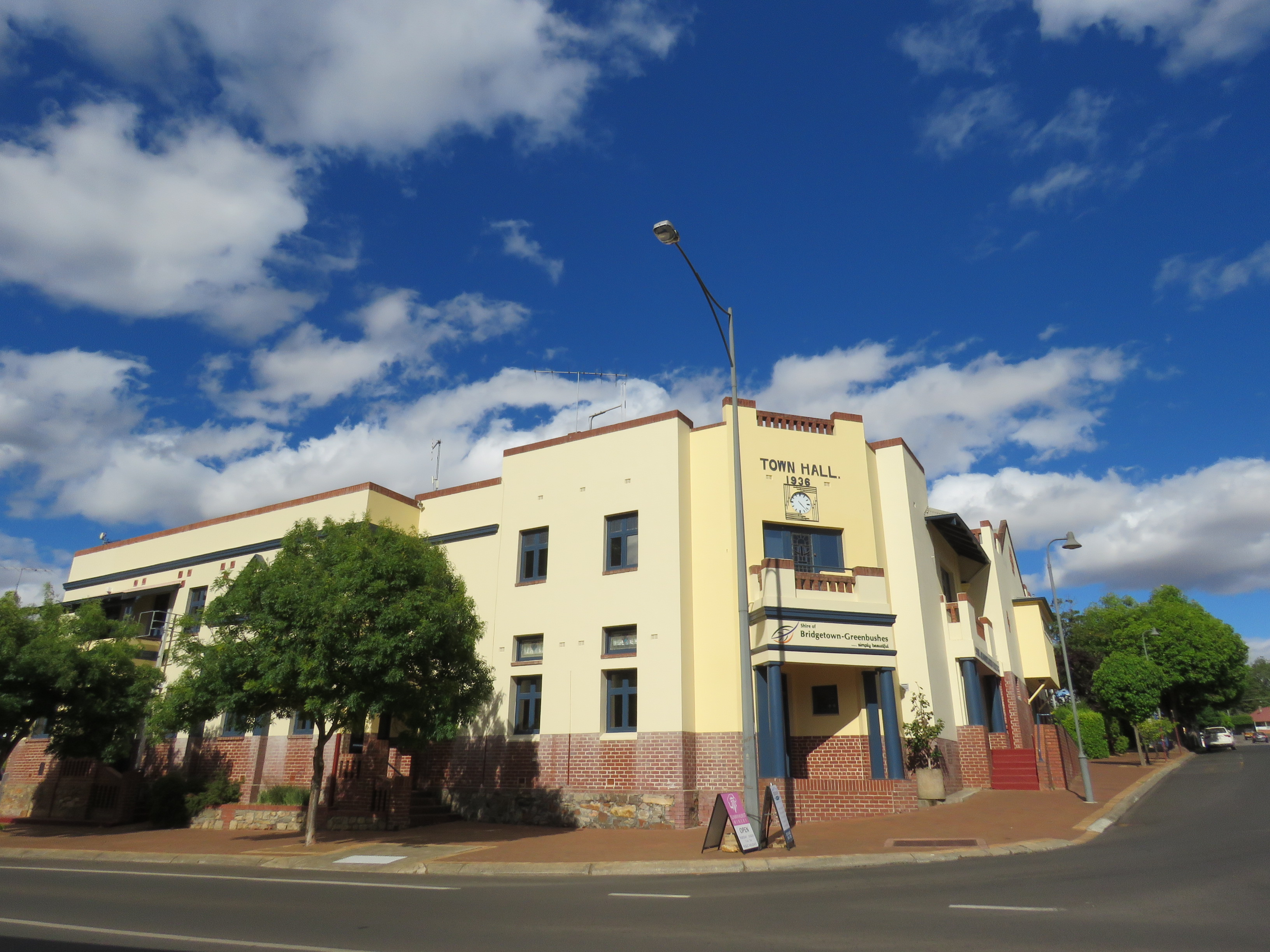
- The Bridgetown-Greenbushes shire offices

- Interactive map of Shire of Bridgetown Greenbushes
- Country: Australia
- State: Western Australia
- Region: South West
- Established: 1970
- Council seat: Bridgetown

Government
  - Shire President: Jenny Mountford
  - State electorate: Warren-Blackwood
  - Federal division: O'Connor

Area
  - Total: 1,339.8 km^{2} (517.3 sq mi)

Population
  - Total: 5,238 (LGA 2021)
- Website: Shire of Bridgetown Greenbushes
LGAs around Shire of Bridgetown Greenbushes
	Donnybrook-Balingup
Nannup	Shire of Bridgetown Greenbushes	Boyup Brook
	Manjimup

The Shire of Bridgetown–Greenbushes is a local government area in the South West region of Western Australia, about 80 kilometres (50 mi) southeast of Bunbury and about 260 kilometres (162 mi) south of the state capital, Perth. The Shire covers an area of 1,340 square kilometres (517 sq mi), and its seat of government is the town of Bridgetown.

== History ==
The Shire of Bridgetown–Greenbushes was established on 26 March 1970 with the amalgamation of the Shire of Bridgetown and the Shire of Greenbushes.

== Indigenous people ==
The Shire of Bridgetown–Greenbushes is located on the traditional land of the Kaneang, Pibelmen and Wadandi peoples, of the Noongar nation.

== Wards ==
Since 2021, the shire is no longer divided into wards. The nine shire councillors each represent the entire shire.

=== 2023 election results ===
2023 Western Australian local elections: Bridgetown–Greenbushes
Party	Candidate	Votes	%	±%
Independent	Jenny Mountford (elected)	467	27.12	
Independent	Mike Fletcher (elected)	335	19.45	
Independent	Tony Pratico (elected)	286	16.61	
Independent	Lyndon Pearce (elected)	280	16.26	
Independent	Trevor Stallard	130	7.55	
Independent	Rebecca Redman (elected)	117	6.79	
Independent	Elke Browne	57	3.31	
Independent	Leigh Carroll	50	2.90	
Total formal votes		1,722	99.42	
Informal votes		10	0.58	
Turnout		1,732	44.55	

== Towns and localities ==
The towns and localities of the Shire of Bridgetown-Greenbushes with population and size figures based on the most recent Australian census:

Locality	Population	Area	Map
Bridgetown	3,168 (SAL 2021)	35 km^{2} (14 sq mi)	
Catterick	171 (SAL 2021)	125.5 km^{2} (48.5 sq mi)	
Glenlynn	112 (SAL 2021)	43.1 km^{2} (16.6 sq mi)	
Greenbushes	365 (SAL 2021)	57.8 km^{2} (22.3 sq mi)	
Hester	101 (SAL 2021)	22.9 km^{2} (8.8 sq mi)	
Hester Brook	127 (SAL 2021)	51.8 km^{2} (20.0 sq mi)	
Kangaroo Gully	512 (SAL 2021)	53.1 km^{2} (20.5 sq mi)	
Kingston	16 (SAL 2021)	312.8 km^{2} (120.8 sq mi)	
Maranup	60 (SAL 2021)	104.8 km^{2} (40.5 sq mi)	
North Greenbushes	174 (SAL 2021)	18.5 km^{2} (7.1 sq mi)	
Sunnyside	100 (SAL 2021)	72.2 km^{2} (27.9 sq mi)	
Wandillup	64 (SAL 2021)	137.3 km^{2} (53.0 sq mi)	
Winnejup	176 (SAL 2021)	160.4 km^{2} (61.9 sq mi)	
Yornup	94 (SAL 2021)	142.2 km^{2} (54.9 sq mi)	

== Heritage-listed places ==
As of 2023, 139 places are heritage-listed in the Shire of Bridgetown–Greenbushes, of which twelve are on the State Register of Heritage Places, among them the Freemasons Hotel, Bridgetown.
