= Balbarrup, Western Australia =

Balbarrup
- Town
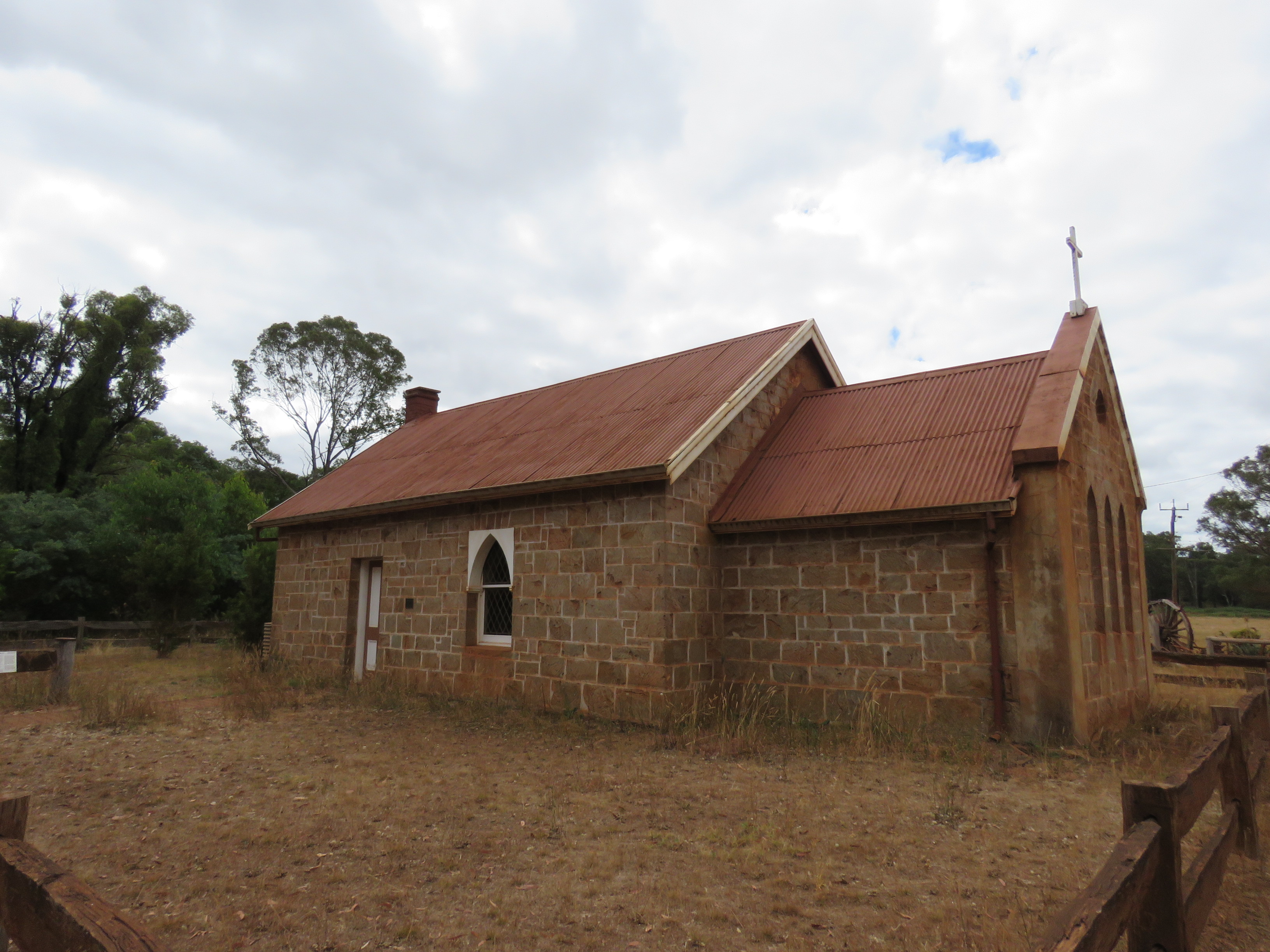
- Dingup Anglican Church

- Coordinates: 34°11′37.90″S 116°16′56.39″E
- Country: Australia
- State: Western Australia
- LGA: Shire of Manjimup

Government
  - State electorate: Warren-Blackwood
  - Federal division: O'Connor

Population
  - Total: 144 (2021 census)
- Postcode: 6258
Localities around Balbarrup
Palgarup	Wilgarrup	Kingston
Ringbark	Balbarrup	Perub
Manjimup	Dingup	Perub

Balbarrup is a locality in the South West region of Western Australia. Its local government area is the Shire of Manjimup. As of the 2021 census, it had a population of 144.

== History ==
The name Balbarrup was first recorded in 1863 and it was originally named Manjimup. It was gazetted in 1903 and given its current name in 1910, due to the establishment of the modern town of Manjimup about 5 kilometres (3 mi) to the west.

The gazetted townsite of Balbarrup is located in the locality of Dingup, south of the current locality of Balbarrup.

== Heritage-listed places ==
As of 2023, 5 places are heritage-listed in Balbarrup; among them is the Dingup Anglican Church, which is on the State Register of Heritage Places.
