= Shire of Greenbushes =

Former local government area in Western Australia

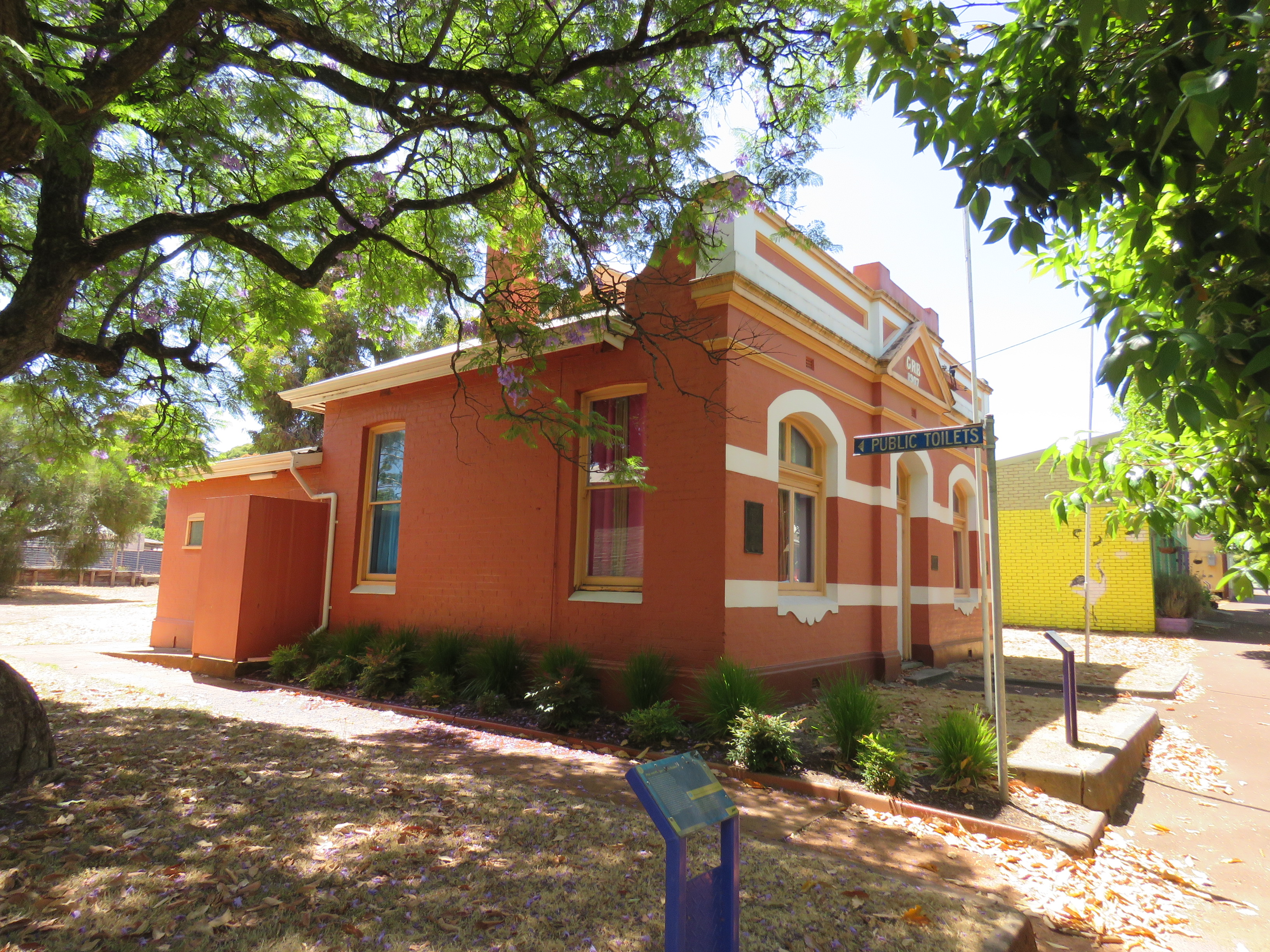
The former Greenbushes Road Board Office

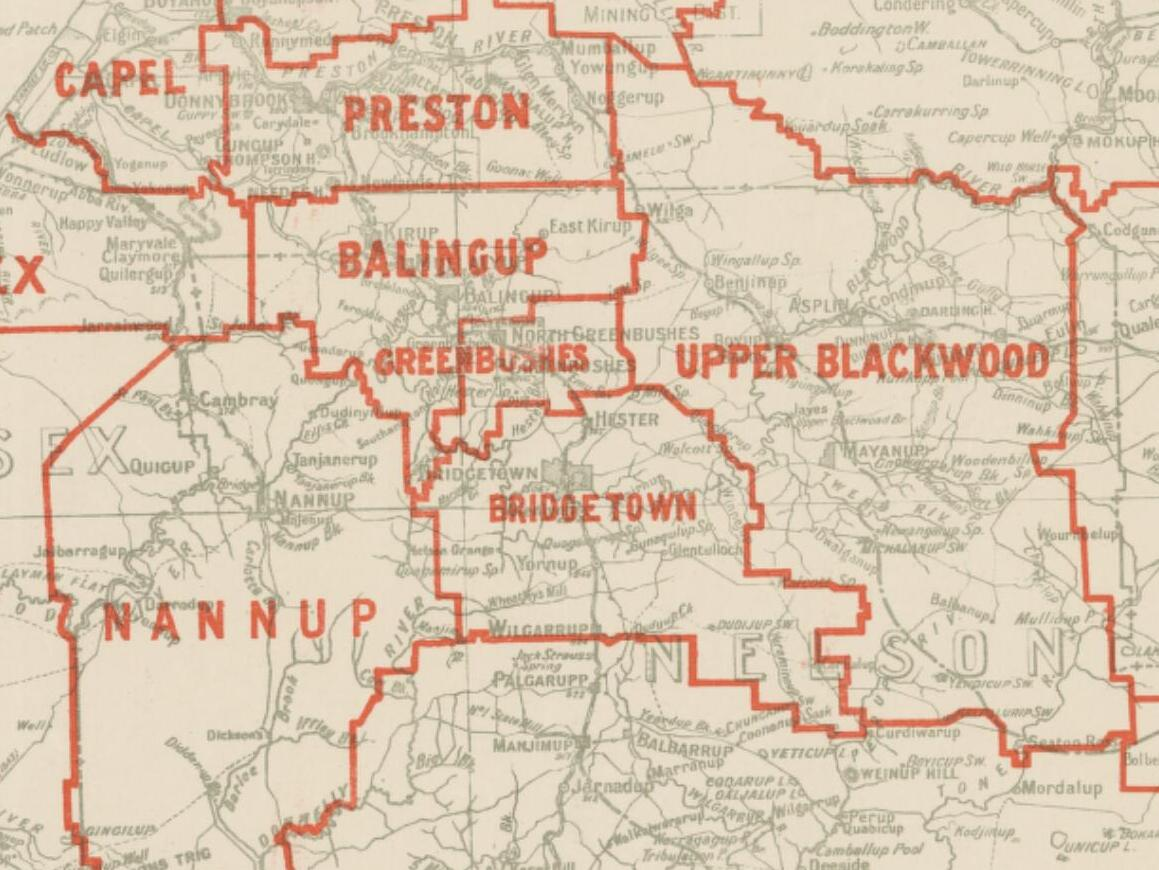
Greenbushes and surrounding road districts, 1935

The Shire of Greenbushes was a local government area in Western Australia, based in the town of Greenbushes. It was established as the Greenbushes Road District on 2 February 1900. The territory of the new road district was largely severed from the Upper Capel Roads Board (later the Shire of Balingup).

The roads board built a permanent office in October 1907 on Blackwood Road in Greenbushes, replacing an earlier temporary office on the same road. The building survives today and is locally heritage-listed.

It was declared a shire and named the Shire of Greenbushes with effect from 1 July 1961 following the passage of the Local Government Act 1960, which reformed all remaining road districts into shires.

The shire ceased to exist on 26 March 1970, when it amalgamated with the Shire of Bridgetown to form the Shire of Bridgetown-Greenbushes.

Politicians Charles Keyser and Charles Layman were both involved with the Greenbushes Road Board prior to their elections to parliament, with Keyser serving as board secretary and Layman as board chairman.
