= Hester, Western Australia =

Hester
- Town
- Coordinates: 33°54′32″S 116°9′40″E
- Country: Australia
- State: Western Australia
- LGA(s): Shire of Bridgetown-Greenbushes
- Location: 262 km (163 mi) from Perth; 7 km (4.3 mi) from Bridgetown
- Established: 1898

Government
  - State electorate(s): Warren-Blackwood
  - Federal division(s): O'Connor

Area
  - Total: 22.9 km^{2} (8.8 sq mi)

Population
  - Total(s): 101 (SAL 2021)
- Postcode: 6254

Hester is a small town in the South West region of Western Australia, 7 km north of Bridgetown on the railway.

It was gazetted a townsite in 1899, and was originally a siding on the Donnybrook to Bridgetown railway, opened in 1898. Later, extended and known as the Northcliffe railway line but passenger services ceased in the late 20th century.

The town derives its name from the nearby Hester Brook, a name first recorded by surveyor John Forrest in 1866. Hester Brook is named after Edward Godfrey Hester, an early settler (late 1850s) of the Bridgetown district.
