= Donnelly River, Western Australia =

Donnelly River
- Town
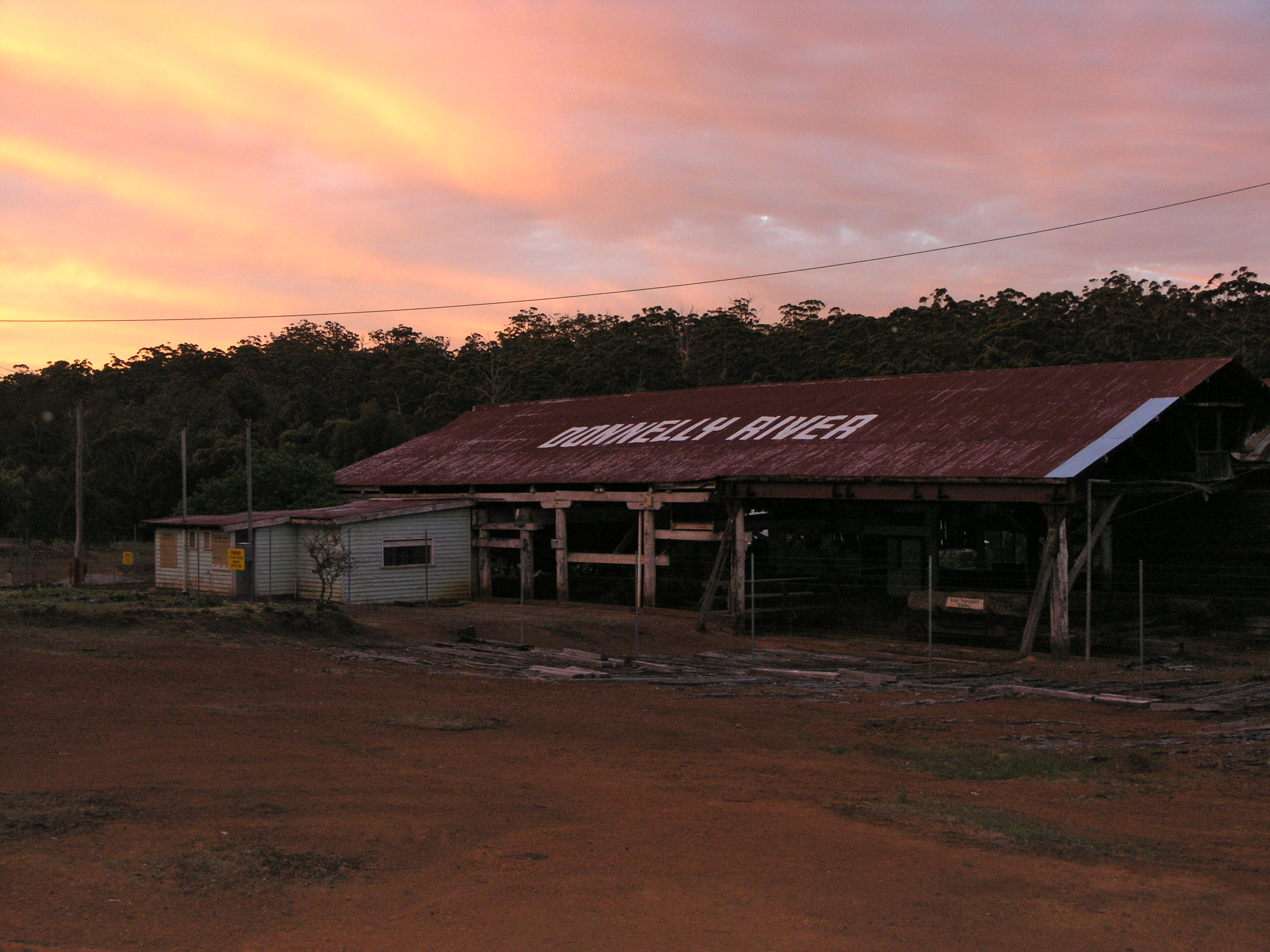
- Donnelly River timber mill

- Interactive map of Donnelly River
- Coordinates: 34.10°S 115.98°E
- Country: Australia
- State: Western Australia
- LGA: Shire of Nannup
- Location: 294 km (183 mi) from Perth; 27 km (17 mi) from Bridgetown; 30 km (19 mi) from Manjimup
- Established: 1912

Government
  - State electorate: Blackwood-Stirling
  - Federal division: Forrest

Area
  - Total: 85.1 km^{2} (32.9 sq mi)

Population
  - Total: 5 (SAL 2016)
- Postcode: 6258

Donnelly River Village is a former timber mill town and present-day holiday village in the Shire of Nannup, in the South West region of Western Australia. The Village is located at a point between Nannup, Bridgetown and Manjimup on the Donnelly River, a small, seasonal river at this point, which flows into the Southern Ocean at 34°29′02.4″S 115°40′27.8″E. The name also applies to a winery downstream on the Vasse Highway and the township's cottages are sometimes confused with cottages built on the lower reaches of the Donnelly River at 34°28′56″S 115°41′00″E.

== History ==
The town was named for the river which flows through it, which in turn was named by Governor James Stirling after Admiral Ross Donnelly, a friend of his wife's family and Rear Admiral of the Red. Although the town was officially called "Wheatley" the name Donnelly River or Donnelly River Village is more commonly used. Some previous residents and other locals also refer to the town as "The Donnelly".

The Donnelly River site was first used as a timber mill by the Wheatley family in 1912 to cut cross arms and telegraph poles, but it closed after two years. In 1947, Bunnings made plans to build a new mill on the Wheatley site to work timber in new permit areas held by the company, with a steam engine purchased from Onkaparinga Woollen Mills in South Australia - Donnelly River became the only steam-driven mill in the South West, officially opening in 1951. The mill and town subsequently provided employment and family homes for a large community for nearly 30 years - many of these families have remained in the district.

It was shut down in 1978 as part of a Forests Department policy to close less efficient mills; it is now heritage listed.

== Present day ==
Donnelly River Village is a small township in the picturesque Donnelly valley located about 300 kilometres (190 mi) south of Perth, Western Australia. It is a preserved mill town surrounded by karri forests. The majority of buildings in the village are built around a central karri parkland which hosts an old play ground called "Belmont Park", as it was once renovated by volunteers from a school in Belmont, Perth. The central parkland also has a "chair" flying fox. Wildlife including emus, kangaroos, kookaburras and parrots are often seen in the area. There are numerous bush walks from the village and the Bibbulmun Track passes through the town. The town is also situated on the Munda Biddi Trail.

The village now comprises a group of over 40 significant buildings, including cottages, a primary school, the previous Workers' Club, a general store and others. The primary school building is now used to house a historical display, which is curated by the Friends of Donnelly Village and also provides budget accommodation for Munda Biddi riders and Bibbulmun Track walkers. Visitors can request a key to the history display at the general store. The old primary school lunch shelter can be used by walkers and riders free of charge. Cottages in the village originally, mostly built for timber mill workers have been restored and now provide holiday accommodation. The general store is open seven days a week and offers basic groceries and snack foods that are sought by trail users. The general store also operates a cafe for snacks and light lunches and administers cottage bookings. Many other buildings were removed when the mill closed, but in the last decade, much work has been done to protect and improve the remaining buildings, within heritage guidelines.

The old mill itself is also heritage listed and is owned by the state government, however there is little being done to preserve this area of Donnelly Village. The mill site itself is fenced off from the public. Much of the structure is now unstable.

Donnelly Village is a significant employer in the area.

Other nearby natural attractions in the area include Four Aces, One Tree Bridge and Glenoran Pool. Donnelly Swimming Dam is a popular picturesque swimming and picnic spot. Nearby towns of Bridgetown, Nannup and Manjimup provide essential services within about 30 minutes of picturesque driving. The whole area is ideal for cycling. Donnelly Village is about one hour's drive from the timber town of Pemberton and the Margaret River area and about two hours drive from the south coast.
