= Yornup, Western Australia =

Yornup
- Town
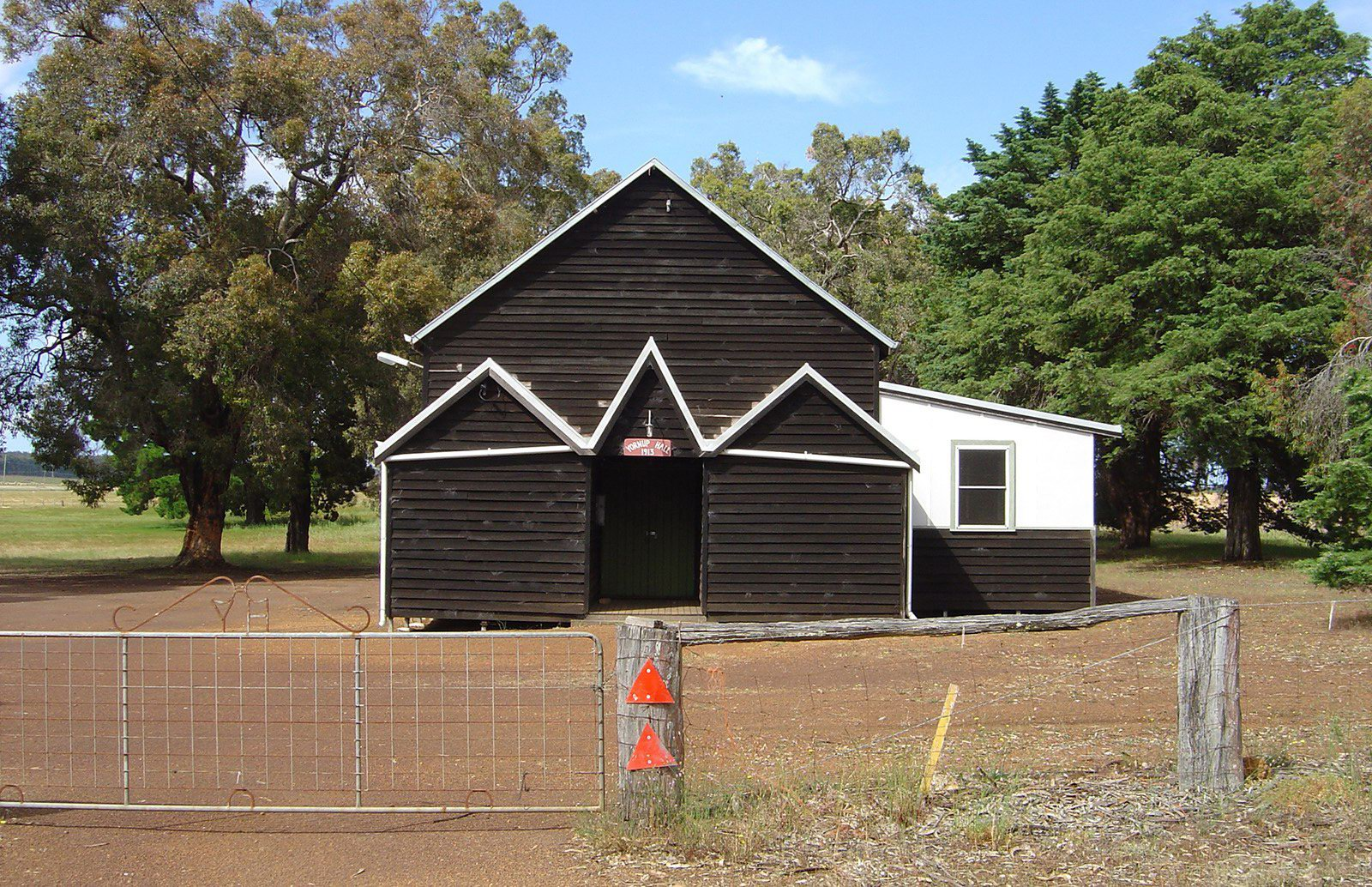
- Yornup Town Hall (Est 1913)

- Coordinates: 34.056°S 116.17°E
- Country: Australia
- State: Western Australia
- LGA(s): Shire of Bridgetown-Greenbushes
- Location: 280 km (170 mi) from Perth; 13 km (8.1 mi) from Bridgetown; 23 km (14 mi) from Manjimup
- Established: 1889

Government
  - State electorate(s): Warren-Blackwood
  - Federal division(s): O'Connor

Area
  - Total: 142.2 km^{2} (54.9 sq mi)

Population
  - Total(s): 94 (SAL 2021)
- Postcode: 6256

Yornup is a small town in the South West region of Western Australia, situated between Bridgetown and Manjimup on the South Western Highway.

It was primarily a milling settlement, and Greenacres Mill continues to this day. A timber company, Lewis and Reid, built a mill in town that was sold in 1923 to Bunning Brothers, who upgraded the mill in 1935 and continued to operate until 1951 when the Donnelly River mill commenced operations.

A railway line between the Donnelly Mill and Yornup was built in 1948, later extended as the Northcliffe railway line and remained in use until the last steam train was retired in 1970.

At one point, Yornup had a school, post office, hall and stores; only the hall remains today, used for community dances. The school was relocated to the rear of 144 Hampton Street, Bridgetown, in March 1996 in anticipation of the construction of a heritage precinct, which never eventuated. A large Western Power substation is located in the town, and an industrial estate is proposed for the area.
