= Bridgetown, Western Australia =

Town in South West region of Western Australia

Bridgetown
- Town
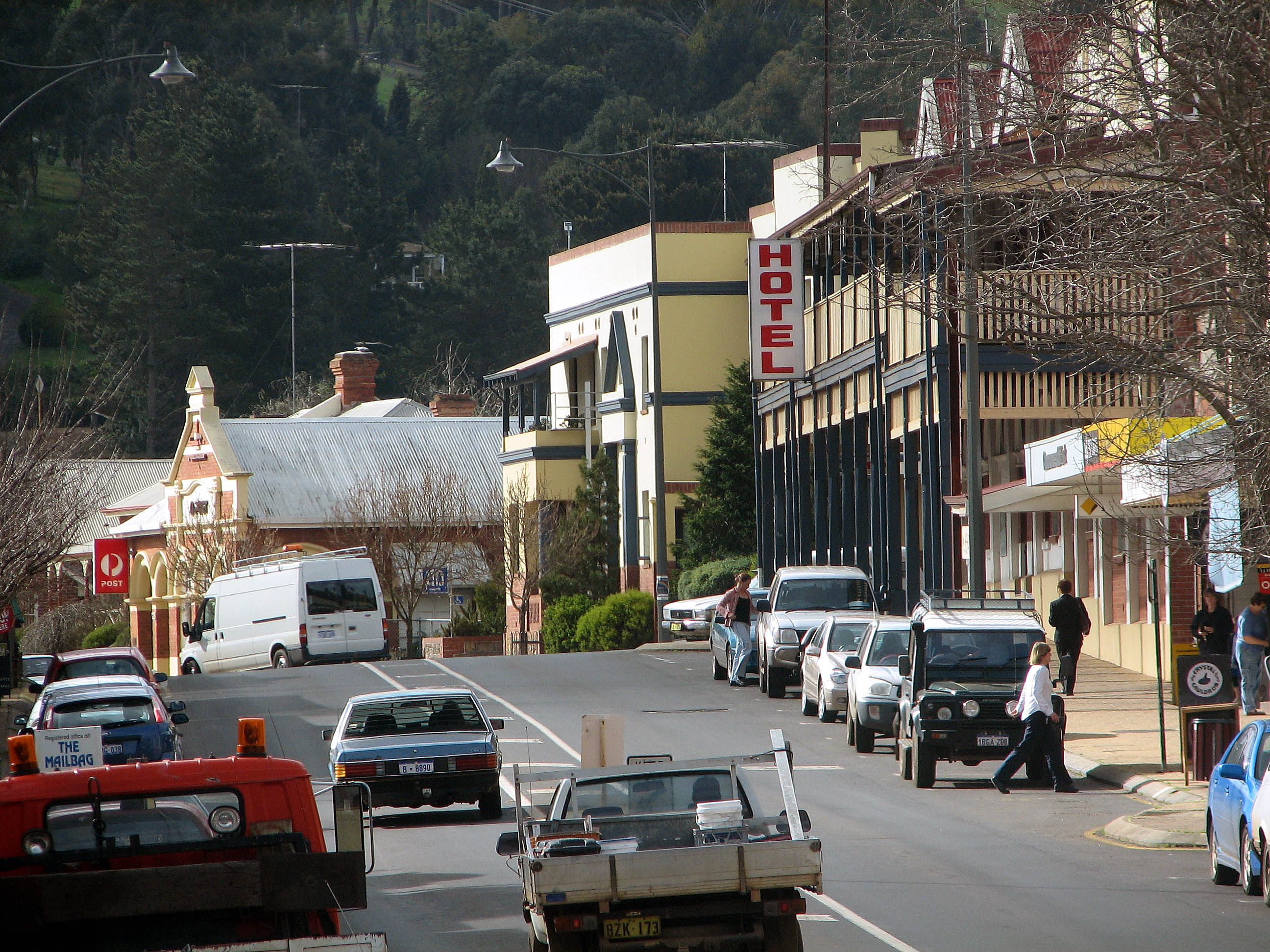
- Hampton Street, the main street of Bridgetown

- Interactive map of Bridgetown
- Coordinates: 33°57′30″S 116°08′17″E
- Country: Australia
- State: Western Australia
- LGA: Shire of Bridgetown-Greenbushes
- Location: 267 km (166 mi) from Perth; 88 km (55 mi) from Bunbury; 36 km (22 mi) from Manjimup; 45 km (28 mi) from Nannup; 31 km (19 mi) from Boyup Brook
- Established: 1868

Government
  - State electorate: Warren-Blackwood
  - Federal division: O'Connor

Area
  - Total: 35 km^{2} (14 sq mi)
- Elevation: 156.6 m (514 ft)

Population
  - Total: 2,300 (UCL 2021)
- Postcode: 6255
- Mean max temp: 22.5 °C (72.5 °F)
- Mean min temp: 8.6 °C (47.5 °F)
- Annual rainfall: 720.1 mm (28.35 in)

Bridgetown is a town in the South West region of Western Australia, approximately 270 kilometres (168 mi) south of Perth on the Blackwood River at the intersection of South Western Highway with Brockman Highway to Nannup and Augusta.

== History ==
The area was originally known as Geegelup, which was believed to mean "place of gilgies" in the Noongar language, referring to the fresh water lobster that inhabits the area. However recent research suggests the actual meaning of Geegelup may be "place of spears".

In 1852, A.C. Gregory made the original survey of the Geegelup area and in 1857, Edward Godfrey Hester (now honoured in nearby Hester) and John Blechynden settled there. In 1861, convicts built the road from Donnybrook into the area. In 1864 the Geegelup Post Office was established in a building on Blechynden's property. A basic police station that had existed since c. 1862 was substantially reconstructed by former convict, Joseph Smith on the south bank of the Blackwood River in mid 1867. Mounted Constable Abraham W. Moulton was the first permanently appointed policeman.

The townsite was surveyed in April 1868 by Thomas Carey, who proposed the name Bridgetown for two reasons – "as it is at a bridge and the Bridgetown was the first ship to put in at Bunbury for the wool from these districts", and was approved and gazetted on 9 June 1868.

From then until about 1885, many buildings including the primary school (1870), post office, new police station (1880) and two hotels were constructed, many of which are still standing today. In 1885, the Bridgetown Agricultural Society was formed and local farmers produced sheep, cattle, dairy products, timber, fruit and nuts. The building boom in Western Australia during the gold boom of the 1890s saw an increased demand for sawn timber, and numerous mills opened in the Bridgetown area. The coming of the railway in 1898 enabled quick access to markets for the many orchardists and helped establish the beginning of a tourist industry.

Until the 1980s, the land surrounding Bridgetown was almost exclusively used for broadacre agriculture and improved pasture. From the late 1970s, the area became increasingly attractive to tourists as a tranquil and picturesque country town an accessible distance from Perth. Some people, attracted by the area's aesthetic qualities and rural lifestyle moved to the town permanently, which resulted in a strong demand for residential and hobby farm allotments, at a time when there was a coincident global downturn in agricultural markets. Many farmers sold up, and much of the most aesthetically pleasing land was subdivided and sold. The demographic change had a profound impact on the town's industry, replacing demand for farm services with demand for services in the tourism and recreation sectors. However, the dramatic increase in infrastructure such as housing, roads and power reticulation detracted from the rural aesthetic that attracted the influx in the first place.

=== Present day ===
Bridgetown is the seat of the Shire of Bridgetown-Greenbushes and the centre of a productive agricultural district. Many buildings in the town centre are over a century old. The town has a Jigsaw Gallery and Museum, which claims to host the only jigsaw collection of its kind in the Southern Hemisphere, and also a primary school (1870) and high school (1962), district hospital, telecentre, shire offices, roadhouse, agricultural showground, shopping facilities, accommodation for travellers (hotel/motel, B&Bs, caravan park) and numerous picnic spots along the Blackwood River. The rural residential area of Kangaroo Gully to the town's east has grown since the 1990s. Each year, Bridgetown hosts many events, including:

- April: Easter Tennis Tournament
- May: Festival of Country Gardens (autumn)
- June to August: Bridgetown in the Winter Festival. Shops are adorned with blue lights, many events and workshops.
- October: Blackwood Marathon
- October: Blackwood Valley Wine Show
- November: Bridgetown Garden Festival
- November: Blues at Bridgetown music festival
- November: Agricultural show (which traces its roots to the 1920s) (held on the last Saturday in November)
- November: Festival of Country Gardens (spring)

The town became the first place in Australia to ban the sale of energy drinks to persons under 18 in February 2023 for an initial trial period of four months.

== Geography ==
=== Climate ===
Bridgetown possesses a borderline warm/hot-summer mediterranean climate (Köppen: Csb/Csa) with warm, dry summers and mild, wet winters. Average maxima vary from 29.9 °C (85.8 °F) in January to 15.8 °C (60.4 °F) in July, while average minima fluctuate between 13.5 °C (56.3 °F) in February and 4.8 °C (40.6 °F) in July. Annual precipitation is rather low (averaging 720.1 mm (28.35 in)), and is spread across 157.9 precipitation days. The town experiences 83.9 clear days and 134.2 cloudy days annually. Extreme temperatures have ranged from 46.1 °C (115.0 °F) on 8 February 1933 to −5.7 °C (21.7 °F) on 17 June 2006.

Climate data for Bridgetown (33.95°S 116.13°E, 179 m AMSL) (1998-2024 normals, extremes to 1907)
Month	Jan	Feb	Mar	Apr	May	Jun	Jul	Aug	Sep	Oct	Nov	Dec	Year
Record high °C (°F)	43.5 (110.3)	46.1 (115.0)	41.5 (106.7)	36.9 (98.4)	31.6 (88.9)	24.6 (76.3)	24.3 (75.7)	26.6 (79.9)	29.8 (85.6)	35.8 (96.4)	39.4 (102.9)	41.5 (106.7)	46.1 (115.0)
Mean maximum °C (°F)	38.9 (102.0)	38.3 (100.9)	36.5 (97.7)	31.1 (88.0)	25.5 (77.9)	20.8 (69.4)	19.6 (67.3)	21.2 (70.2)	24.0 (75.2)	28.7 (83.7)	33.3 (91.9)	37.4 (99.3)	39.9 (103.8)
Mean daily maximum °C (°F)	29.9 (85.8)	29.8 (85.6)	27.3 (81.1)	23.4 (74.1)	19.6 (67.3)	16.7 (62.1)	15.8 (60.4)	16.4 (61.5)	17.8 (64.0)	20.4 (68.7)	24.5 (76.1)	27.8 (82.0)	22.5 (72.4)
Daily mean °C (°F)	21.5 (70.7)	21.7 (71.1)	19.7 (67.5)	16.4 (61.5)	13.2 (55.8)	11.0 (51.8)	10.3 (50.5)	10.8 (51.4)	12.0 (53.6)	13.8 (56.8)	16.9 (62.4)	19.5 (67.1)	15.6 (60.0)
Mean daily minimum °C (°F)	13.1 (55.6)	13.5 (56.3)	12.1 (53.8)	9.3 (48.7)	6.8 (44.2)	5.3 (41.5)	4.8 (40.6)	5.2 (41.4)	6.1 (43.0)	7.1 (44.8)	9.3 (48.7)	11.1 (52.0)	8.6 (47.6)
Mean minimum °C (°F)	5.5 (41.9)	6.1 (43.0)	4.4 (39.9)	2.5 (36.5)	0.7 (33.3)	−1.0 (30.2)	−1.5 (29.3)	−0.5 (31.1)	0.1 (32.2)	1.1 (34.0)	2.6 (36.7)	4.2 (39.6)	−2.2 (28.0)
Record low °C (°F)	0.9 (33.6)	0.5 (32.9)	−0.9 (30.4)	−2.2 (28.0)	−2.5 (27.5)	−5.7 (21.7)	−4.4 (24.1)	−3.9 (25.0)	−2.8 (27.0)	−2.2 (28.0)	−0.9 (30.4)	0.0 (32.0)	−5.7 (21.7)
Average precipitation mm (inches)	14.3 (0.56)	12.9 (0.51)	21.3 (0.84)	49.5 (1.95)	95.1 (3.74)	107.8 (4.24)	127.1 (5.00)	117.9 (4.64)	86.0 (3.39)	43.7 (1.72)	31.4 (1.24)	16.5 (0.65)	720.1 (28.35)
Average precipitation days (≥ 0.2 mm)	3.7	3.5	6.0	11.7	18.7	21.9	24.6	23.5	19.3	12.8	7.5	4.7	157.9
Average afternoon relative humidity (%)	34	33	38	48	59	67	69	65	62	57	45	37	51
Average dew point °C (°F)	8.9 (48.0)	9.1 (48.4)	8.8 (47.8)	9.2 (48.6)	9.6 (49.3)	8.8 (47.8)	8.2 (46.8)	8.2 (46.8)	8.3 (46.9)	9.0 (48.2)	9.1 (48.4)	8.3 (46.9)	8.8 (47.8)
Source: Bureau of Meteorology (1998-2024 normals, extremes to 1907)

== Transport ==
Bridgetown was a stop on the Northcliffe railway line but passenger services ceased in the late 20th century.

== Notable people ==
- Emily Barker, singer-songwriter
- Jon Doust, author and comedian
- Robyn McSweeney, politician
- Tom O'Dwyer, cricketer
- David Reid, politician
- Deborah Robertson, novelist and poet
- Fred Riebeling, politician
- Len Pascoe, cricketer
- Bruce Maslin, botanist

== Gallery ==
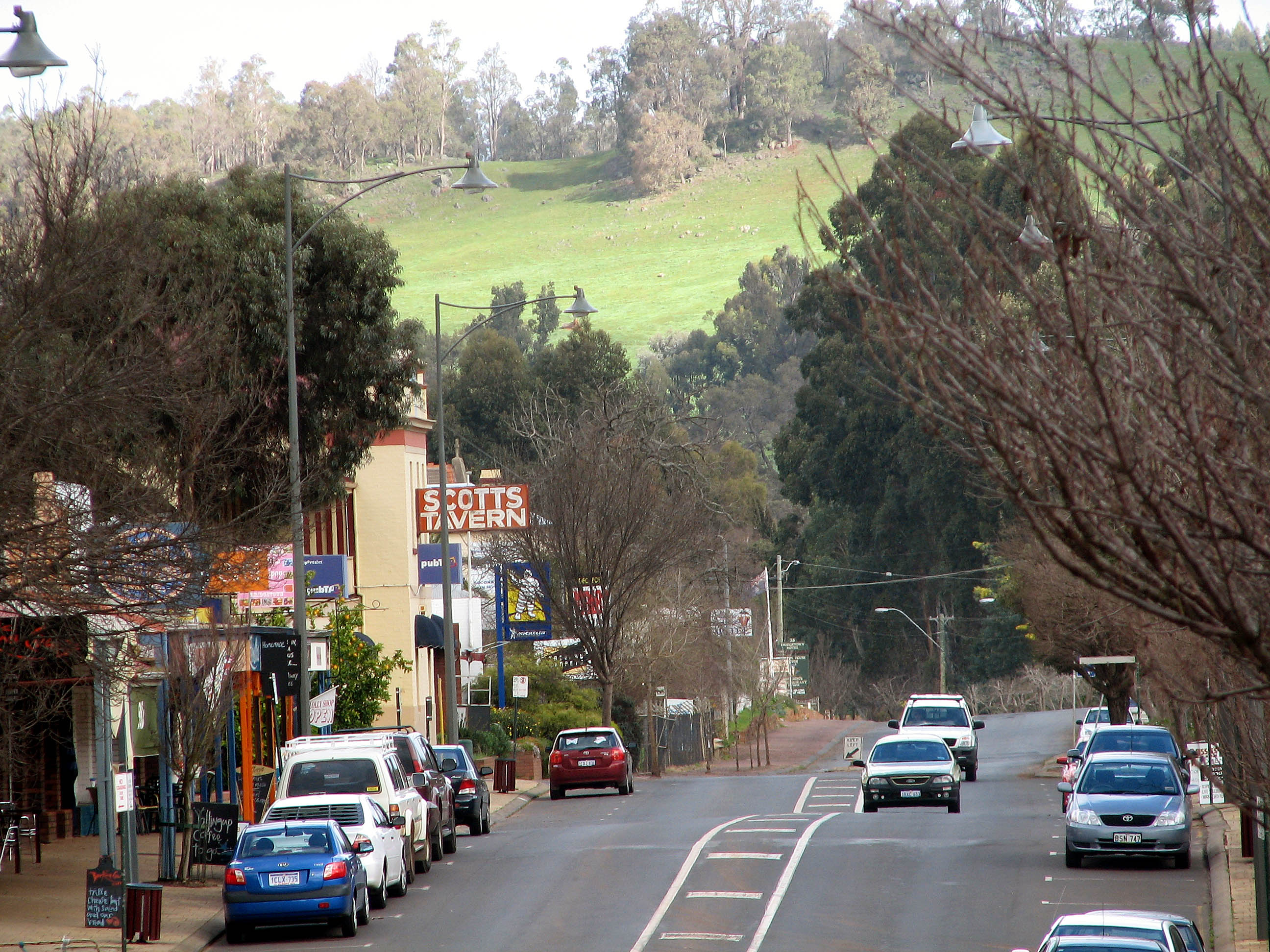
Main street, Bridgetown, August 2007

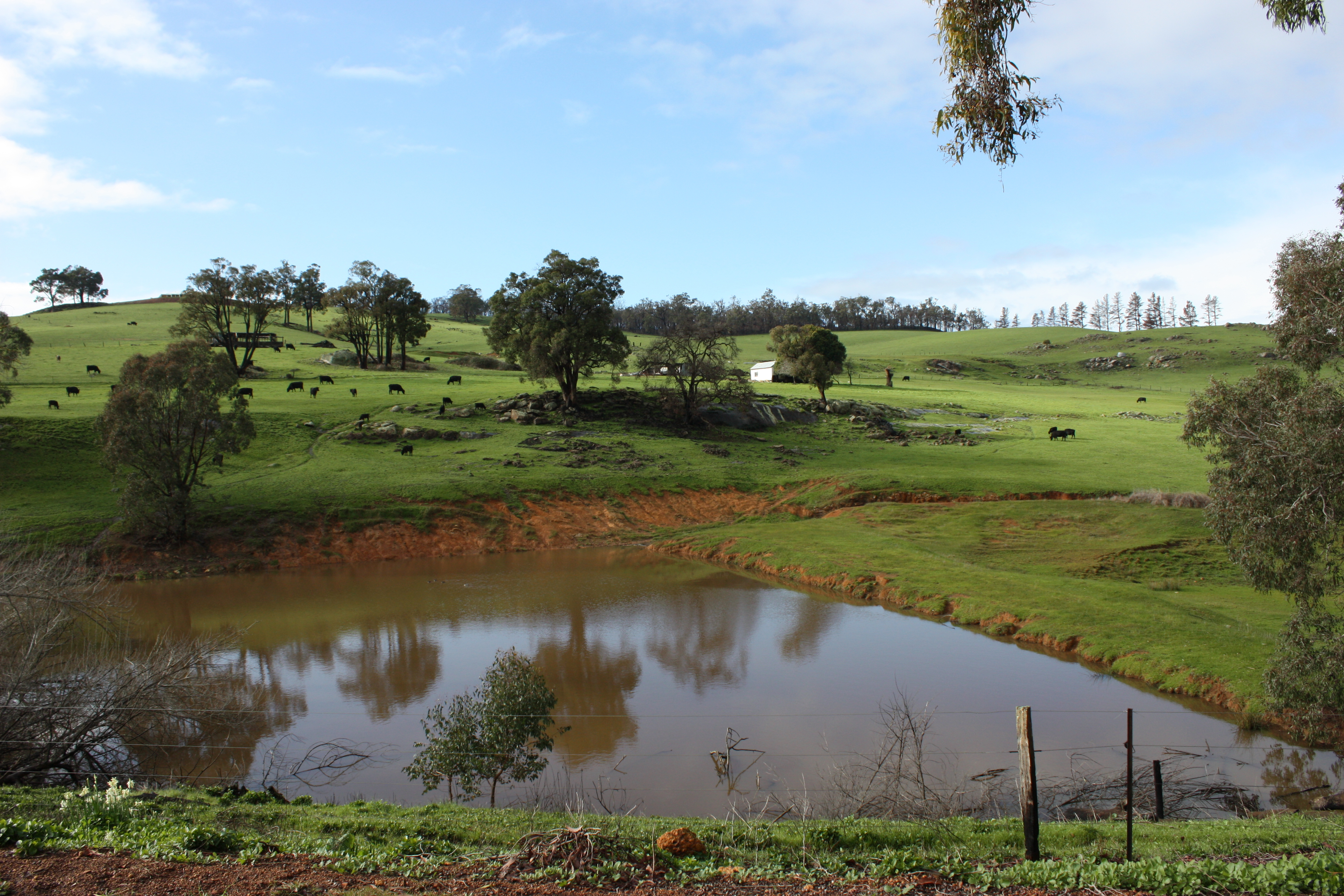
A typical rural landscape in the vicinity of Bridgetown
