= Brockman National Park =

National park in Western Australia

- IUCN category II (national park)
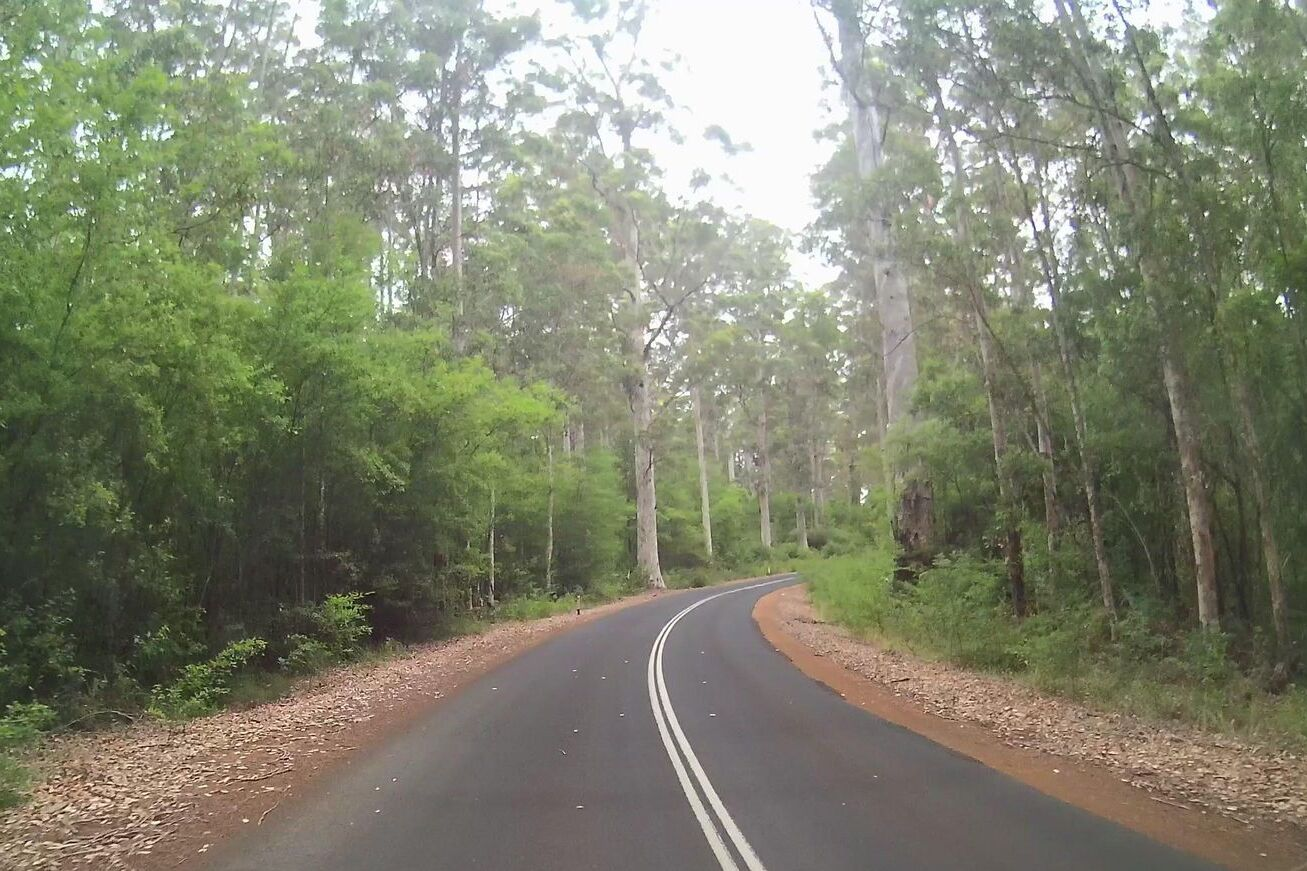
- Road leading through the park

- Location within Western Australia
- Location: Western Australia
- Nearest city: Pemberton
- Coordinates: 34°30′52″S 115°59′46″E
- Area: 52 ha (130 acres)
- Established: 1977
- Governing body: Department of Environment and Conservation
- Website: dec.wa.gov.au/component/option,com_hotproperty/task,view/id,123/Itemid,1584/

Brockman National Park is a national park in the South West region of Western Australia, 288 kilometres (179 mi) south of Perth and 10 km (6.2 mi) south of Pemberton.

The park, situated on both sides of the Pemberton-Northcliffe road, is a eucalypt forest composed of karri Eucalyptus diversicolor interspersed with marri Corymbia calophylla. The forest understorey is made up of a mix of plants including the swamp peppermint Taxandria linearifolia, karri hazel, karri wattle (Acacia pentadenia) and the karri sheoak Allocasuarina decussata , all of which thrive in the damp conditions.

The northern border of the park is the Warren River and the Warren National Park borders it to the west.

No entry fee applies for the park and no facilities are available to visitors.

The name is taken from the nearby Yeagarup Homestead that used to be known as Brockman Station.

== See also ==
- Protected areas of Western Australia
