= List of named Eucalyptus trees =

This table lists famous individual trees in the genus Eucalyptus.

Tree	Species common name	Species scientific name	Location	Approx. germination year	Dimensions	Reason for fame
The Ada Tree	Mountain ash	E. regnans	Near Powelltown, Victoria	1700	76 m high, 15 m in circumference at base	One of Victoria's largest trees, and a tourist attraction
Big Foot	Mountain ash	E. regnans	Near Geeveston, Tasmania	1560	81 m high, 6.5 m in diameter at base	Unusually large trunk base with buttress roots
Burke's Burial Tree	Coolibah	E. microtheca	Innamincka, South Australia			Site associated with the Burke and Wills expedition; listed by National Trust of South Australia
Canoe Tree	River red gum	E. camaldulensis	Currency Creek, South Australia			Aboriginal canoe tree; listed by National Trust of South Australia
Cazneaux Tree	River red gum	E. camaldulensis	Near Wilpena Pound, South Australia			This tree was the subject of an award-winning photograph taken in 1937 by Harold Cazneaux, entitled "Spirit of Endurance"; listed by National Trust of South Australia
The Centurion	Mountain ash	E. regnans	Southern Tasmania		99.6 m tall, 4.05 m in diameter	The world's tallest known living eucalypt and the tallest tree in Australia
Dave Evans Bicentennial Tree	Karri	E. diversicolor	near Pemberton, Western Australia			Originally used as a fire-patrol tower, now an attraction which can be climbed by tourists.
Diamond Tree	Karri	E. diversicolor	Near Manjimup, Western Australia			Originally used as a fire-patrol tower, now an attraction which can be climbed by tourists.
Dig Tree	Coolibah	E. coolabah	Cooper Creek, Queensland	1760		Historic markings in 1861 during the ill-fated Burke and Wills expedition
The Four Aces (group of trees)	Karri	E. diversicolor	Near Manjimup, Western Australia	1600	75 m tall	Four trees in a line, registered by Heritage Council of Western Australia
Giant tingle tree or Hollow Trunk	Red tingle	E. jacksonii	Walpole-Nornalup National Park, Western Australia		30m tall, 22-24m diameter circumference	Claimed as largest girthed living eucalypt. Burned out Hollow trunk
Gloucester Tree	Karri	E. diversicolor	Near Pemberton, Western Australia		61 m high	Originally used as a fire-patrol tower, now an attraction which can be climbed by tourists.
Herbig's Tree	River red gum	E. camaldulensis	Near Springton, South Australia	Between 1500 and 1700	24 m tall, 7 m in diameter at base	Hollow tree used as a home by Johann Friedrich Herbig and his family 1855 to 1860. Listed by National Trust of South Australia
Hoddle survey tree	River red gum	E. camaldulensis	Melbourne, Victoria	c. 1700	36 m tall, 3.6 m girth 12.5-13 m canopy	Tree used as a survey marker by Robert Hoddle from 1844; added to the Victorian Heritage Register
Icarus Dream	Mountain ash	E. regnans	Tasmania		97 m tall, 2.9 m in diameter at base	Reputed to be the second tallest living eucalypt in the world
Kermandie Queen	Mountain ash	E. regnans	Near Geeveston, Tasmania	1500s	77 m tall, 21.65 m in circumference at base	Once reputed to be the tallest living eucalypt in the world along with Big Foot
Lathamus Keep	Tasmanian blue gum	E. globulus (subsp. globulus)	Huon Valley, Tasmania	1500s	80 m tall, 17 m in circumference at base	Regarded as the tallest known remaining Tasmanian blue gum
The Old Gum Tree	Red gum	E. camaldulensis	Glenelg North, South Australia	Unknown, tree now deceased		Site is linked to the Proclamation of South Australia in 1836
Old Jarrah Tree	Jarrah	E. marginata	Armadale, Western Australia	Between 1200 and 1600		Listed by Heritage Council of Western Australia and National Trust of Western Australia
The Separation Tree	River red gum	E. camaldulensis	Royal Botanic Gardens Victoria	1600	24 m high	Location of celebrations marking the separation of Victoria from New South Wales on 18 November 1850
Tree of Knowledge	Ghost gum	E. aparrerinja	Barcaldine, Queensland	Unknown, tree now deceased		Site of foundation of Australian Labor Party by a group of protesting sheep shearers in 1891
Twin Ghost Gums	Ghost gums	E. aparrerinja	Road to Hermannsburg, Northern Territory	Trees destroyed by fire in 2013		Subject of the watercolour Twin Ghosts by Albert Namatjira

== See also ==
- List of individual trees
