= Acacia subracemosa =

Western karri wattle

Scientific classification
- Kingdom: Plantae
- Clade: Tracheophytes
- Clade: Angiosperms
- Clade: Eudicots
- Clade: Rosids
- Order: Fabales
- Family: Fabaceae
- Subfamily: Caesalpinioideae
- Clade: Mimosoid clade
- Genus: Acacia
- Species: A. subracemosa

Binomial name
- Acacia subracemosa Maslin
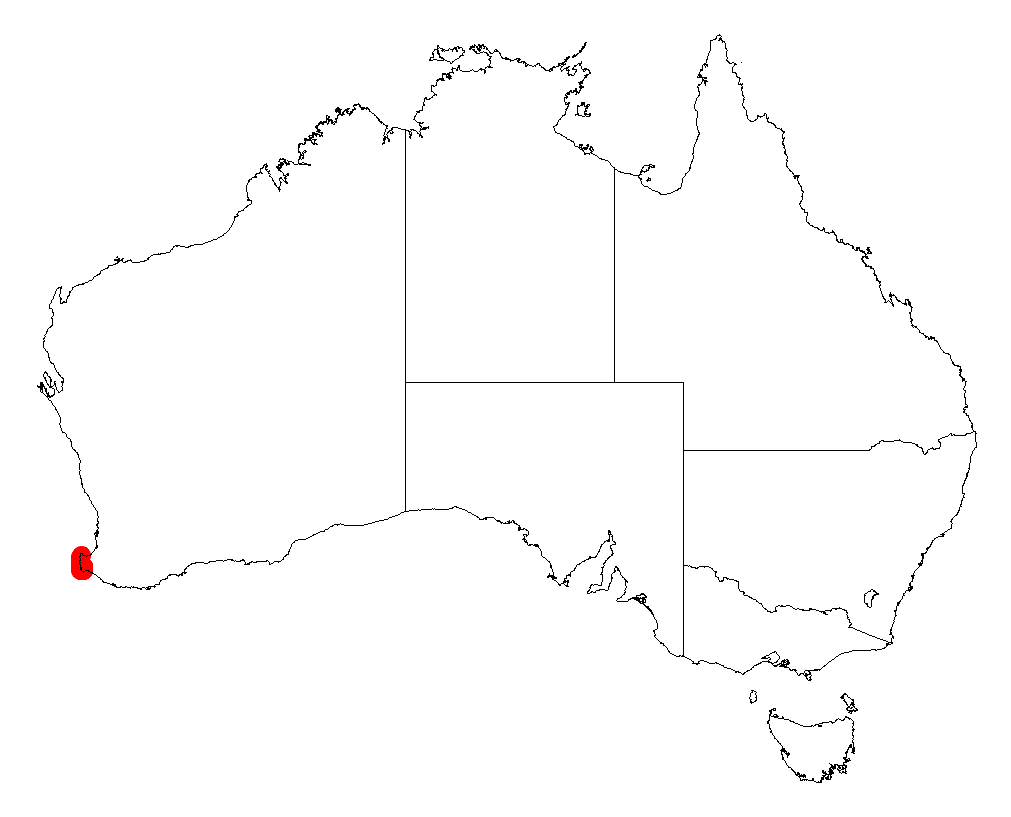
- Occurrence data from AVH

Species of shrub

Acacia subracemosa, also known as western karri wattle, is a shrub of the genus Acacia and the subgenus Pulchellae that is endemic to a small area of south western Australia

== Description ==
The spreading shrub typically grows to a height of 1.8 to 5 metres (6 to 16 ft) and has hairy branchlets. The leaves are composed of three to six pairs of pinnae. It blooms from September to November and produces cream-yellow flowers.

== Distribution ==
It is native to an area in the South West region of Western Australia where it is found growing in sandy soils over and around limestone. The range of the plant extends from near Witchcliffe in the north and around Augusta with the bulk of the population located to the west of Karridale usually as a part of Eucalyptus diversicolor (karri) forest communities.

== See also ==
- List of Acacia species
