= Hoddle survey tree =

Heritage-listed tree in Melbourne, Victoria, Australia

- Location of the tree in Greater Metropolitan Melbourne
- Interactive map of Hoddle survey tree
- Species: River Red Gum
- Location: Kew Golf Course, Kew East, Melbourne, Victoria, Australia
- Coordinates: 37°47′19″S 145°02′57″E
- Height: 36 m (118 ft) (2014)
- Girth: 3.6 m (12 ft) (2014)
- Custodian: Kew Golf Club

Victorian Heritage Register
- Official name: Hoddle Survey Tree, Kew Golf Club
- Type: Registered place
- Criteria: b., h.
- Designated: 9 October 2014
- Reference no.: VHR H2340
- Heritage overlay no.: HO621
- Categories: Parks, Gardens and Trees; Landscape - Cultural; Exploration, Survey and Events

The Hoddle survey tree is a River Red Gum tree and survey marker, located on the Kew Golf Course, at 120B Belford Road in Kew East, in the City of Boroondara, in the inner eastern suburbs of Melbourne, in Victoria, Australia.

In use by Robert Hoddle from 1844 and located on the traditional lands of the Wurundjeri people, the tree was added to the Victorian Heritage Register on 9 October 2014 in recognition of its historical and technical significance; and was also added to a non-statutory list by the Victorian branch of the National Trust on 8 September 1994.

== History ==
The Hoddle survey tree is a remnant River Red Gum (Eucalyptus camaldulensis) used by Robert Hoddle in April 1844 as a reference marker when he surveyed Kew in Melbourne's eastern suburbs. Hoddle's 1844 field book shows the location of the tree south of the Yarra River notated with 1. Stake Gum.

Hoddle arrived in the District of Port Phillip in March 1837, and was appointed senior surveyor. From 1837 Hoddle was the Officer-in-Charge of the Port Phillip Survey Department and became the first Surveyor General of Victoria in 1851. He was a central figure in the history of surveying, cartography, and geography in Victoria. The period 1837 to 1851 saw much survey work by Hoddle and his survey team. It was a period of expansion in terms of population and the discovery of gold in 1851 required that land be surveyed for orderly use. Hoddle's first map of Melbourne was completed in March 1837. By 1838 Hoddle had surveyed and planned Geelong and later surveyed many country areas of Victoria. Hoddle is remembered for his significant role in laying out the design of the central business district of Melbourne as the Hoddle Grid, with wide major streets and narrow secondary lanes. His plan allowed for impressive boulevards and many public parks and gardens.

In 1994 John Parker, the incumbent Surveyor General, confirmed the identity, location, and history of this tree. Known and fixed reference points are critical to the surveying of land, and hills or trees were often used prior to modern surveying techniques. As of 2014, the tree was believed to be over 300 years old.

== Description ==
The Hoddle survey tree is growing on the south bank of the Yarra River in the grounds of the Kew Golf Course. The tree is adjacent to the Belford Road extension and below the twelfth green. As of February 2014, the tree was 36 metres (118 ft) tall; had a girth of 3.6 metres (12 ft); and its canopy had north–south spread of 12.5 metres (41 ft), and an east–west spread of 13 metres (43 ft).

== See also ==
- List of places on the Victorian Heritage Register in the City of Boroondara
- List of named Eucalyptus trees
