= Separation Tree =

Coordinates: 37°49′44″S 144°59′03″E

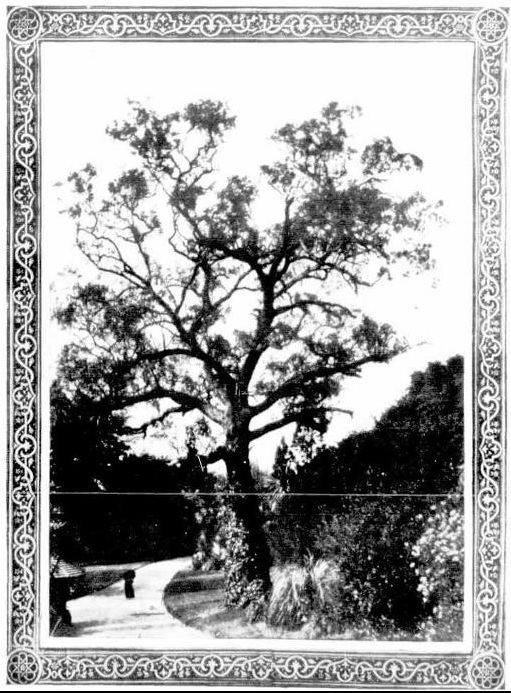
Separation Tree circa 1910

The Separation tree is a heritage listed Eucalyptus camaldulensis tree, commonly known as a red river gum, located in the Royal Botanic Gardens Victoria in Melbourne in Victoria.

Found on the Tennyson Lawn the tree was one of two original river red gums that were along the banks of the swampy billabong which makes up part of the Ornamental Lake.

The tree is a Melbourne landmark and is best known as the site where the citizens of the city congregated on 15 November 1850 to celebrate when the news that Victoria was to separate from the colony of New South Wales after it had been announced by Governor La Trobe. It is one of the few trees left in the garden that pre-dates European colonization. The tree was approximately 24 m (79 ft) in height with a canopy that was around 27 m (89 ft) wide. The trunk had a circumference of 3.83 m (13 ft) at its girth. A plaque commemorating the centenary of the separation of the colonies was placed at the base of the tree in 1951.

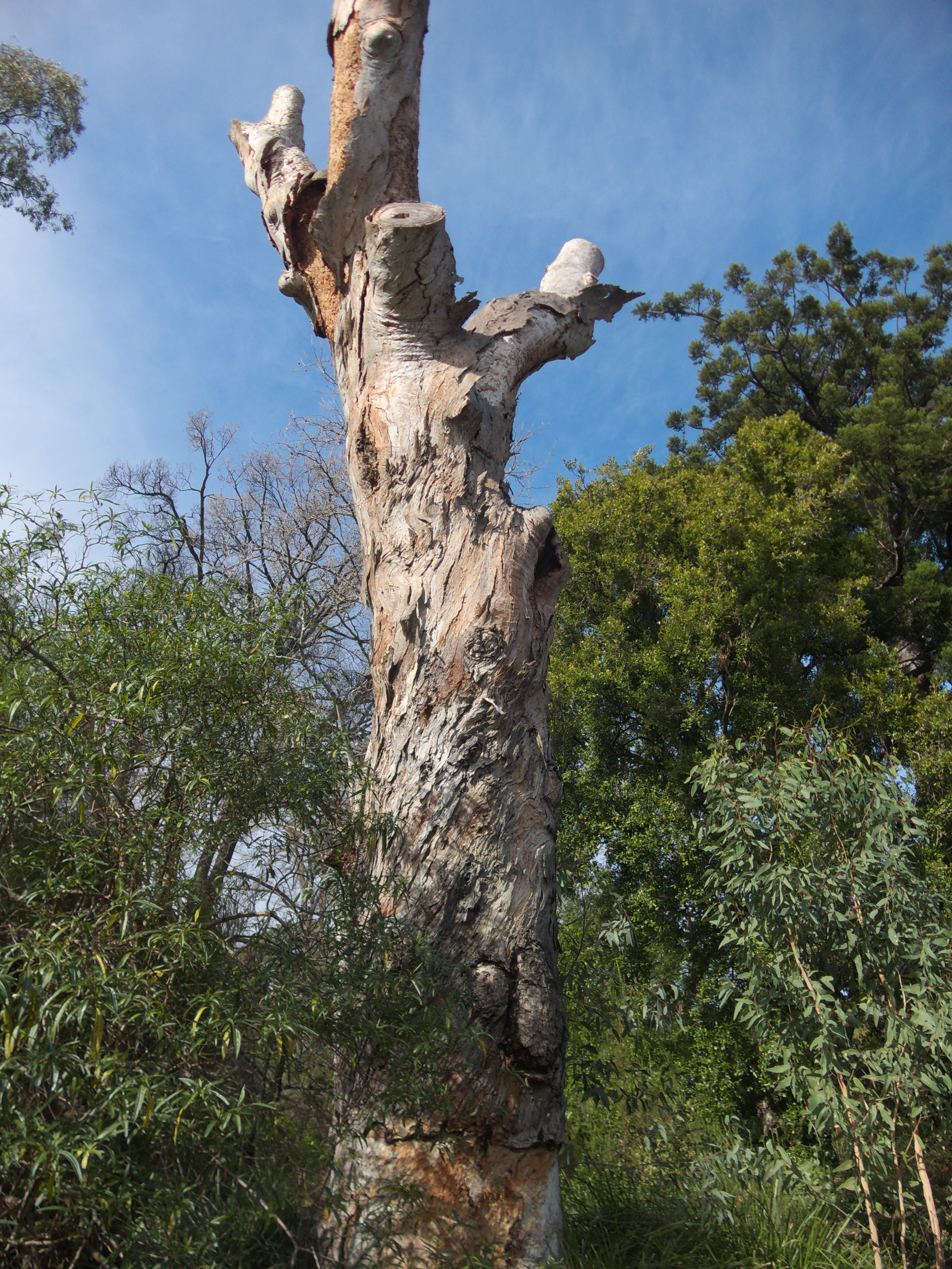
Remains of the tree in 2018

In 1982 the Separation Tree was placed on the Significant Tree Register of the National Trust of Victoria.

In 2010 and again in 2013 the 400 year old tree was damaged in acts of vandalism. In the 2010 attack the tree was ringbarked and about 90 per cent of the cambial tissue removed. The wound was further widened and the remaining 10 per cent was destroyed in the 2013 attack.

The tree canopy and parts of the trunk were lopped in 2015 after it was confirmed to be dead. By July 2015 only the main trunk and parts of three scaffold limbs remained. There are 26 separate plantings of saplings of the original tree scattered around Victoria including one in the botanic gardens in Melbourne and another in the garden at Parliament House.

== See also ==
- List of individual trees
- List of named Eucalyptus trees
