= Old Jarrah Tree =

Jarrah tree in Armadale, Western Australia

Old Jarrah tree
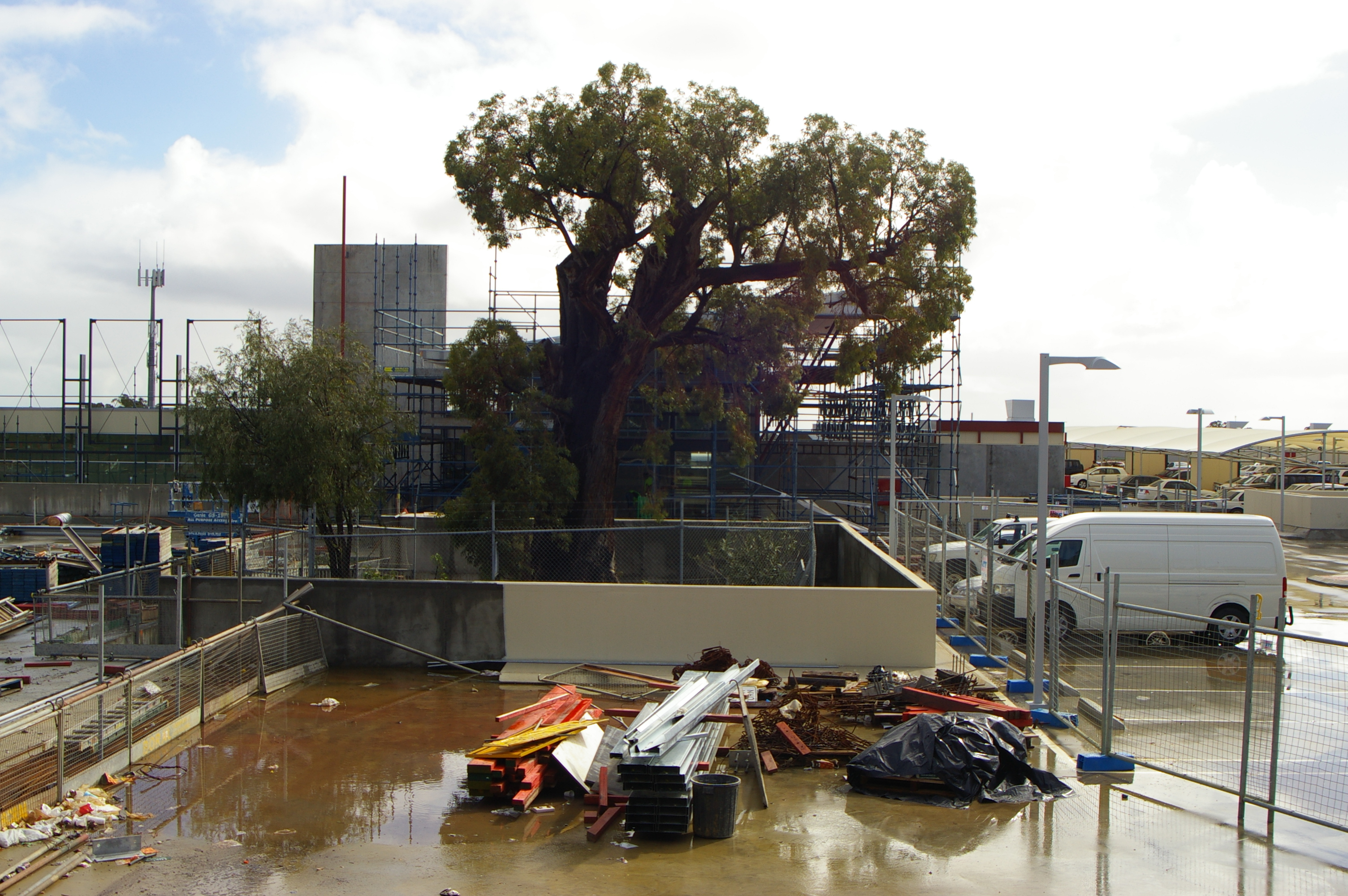
- Old Jarrah Tree

- Location within Perth
- Species: Jarrah (Eucalyptus marginata)
- Location: Armadale, Western Australia
- Coordinates: 32°09′15″S 116°00′58″E
- Website

Western Australia Heritage Register
- Designated: 9 September 2003
- Reference no.: 9009

The Old Jarrah tree is an exceptionally large and old Eucalyptus marginata (Jarrah) tree near inside the carpark the entrance at the corner Third Road and Church Avenue in Armadale, Western Australia. It is estimated to be between 400 and 800 years old. Trees of such a great size and age are rare in and around the Perth metropolitan area, because of extensive logging of the area in the 19th century. The tree is in fairly poor condition: about three quarters of its canopy is dead or gone, and it is less than half its normal height due to lopping. It was ringbarked by vandals in 1997, and it has responded by producing numerous epicormic shoots on its north side. Despite these issues, the tree is considered to be in a stable condition.

Attempts to have the tree destroyed were twice defeated by community groups, in 1987 and again in 1997. In 1997 a Conservation Order was issued for the tree after the Minister for Heritage received 1,147 submissions asking that it be saved. It is now part of the Bicentennial Heritage Tree Trail, and is included on both the Heritage Council of Western Australia's Register of Heritage Areas and the Tree Register of the National Trust of Australia (Western Australia). It is one of only three trees or groups of trees in Western Australia to be heritage listed.

== See also ==
- List of individual trees
- List of named Eucalyptus trees
- Armadale, Western Australia

== General references ==
- Heritage Council of Western Australia (1997). "Jarrah Tree, Armadale" (PDF). Register of Heritage Places - Assessment Documentation. Archived from the original (PDF) on 31 August 2007.
