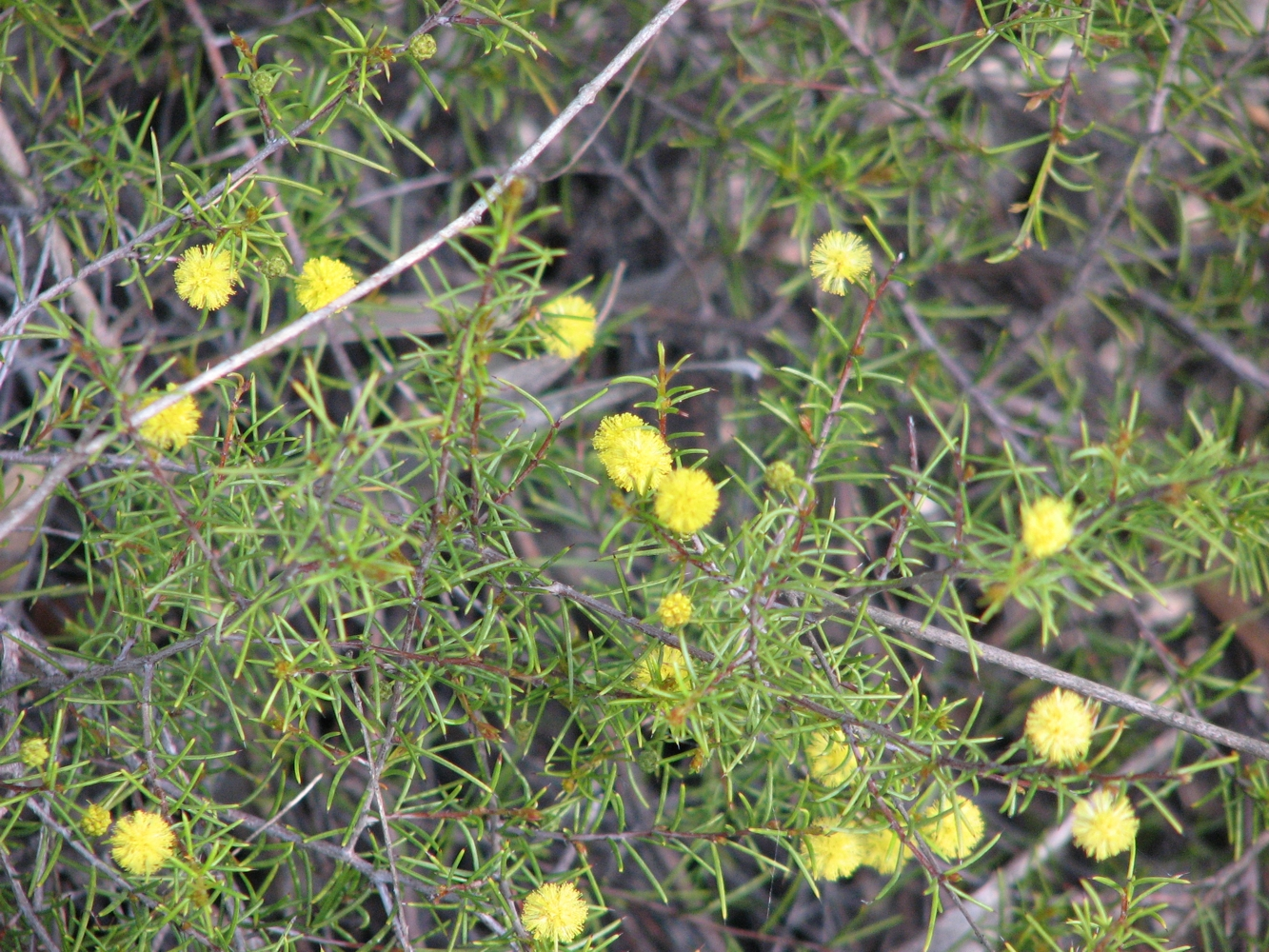

Scientific classification
- Kingdom: Plantae
- Clade: Embryophytes
- Clade: Tracheophytes
- Clade: Angiosperms
- Clade: Eudicots
- Clade: Rosids
- Order: Fabales
- Family: Fabaceae
- Subfamily: Caesalpinioideae
- Clade: Mimosoid clade
- Genus: Acacia
- Species: A. brownii

Binomial name
- Acacia brownii (Poir.) Steud.
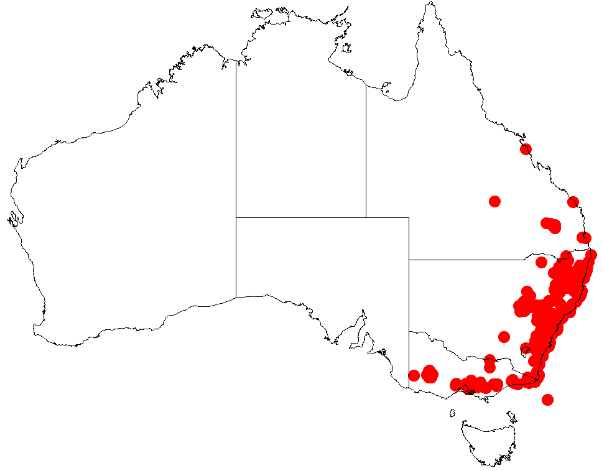
- Occurrence data from AVH

Synonyms
- List: Acacia acicularis R.Br. nom. illeg.; Acacia acicularis Lodd., G.Lodd. & W.Lodd. nom. inval., nom. nud.; Acacia arceuthos Spreng.; Acacia brownei Steud. orth. var.; Acacia juniperina var. brownei Benth. orth. var.; Acacia juniperina var. brownii Benth.; Acacia pugioniformis H.L.Wendl. nom. illeg., nom. superfl.; Acacia ulicifolia var. brownei Pedley orth. var.; Acacia ulicifolia var. brownii (Poir.) Pedley; Mimosa brownei Poir. orth. var.; Mimosa brownii Poir.; Racosperma brownei Pedley orth. var.; Racosperma brownii (Poir.) Pedley

= Acacia brownii =

Heath wattle

Species of legume

Acacia brownii, commonly known as heath wattle or prickly Moses, is a species of flowering plant in the family Fabaceae and is endemic to eastern continental Australia. It is an erect or spreading shrub with more or less rigid, straight, sharply-pointed phyllodes, bright yellow flowers arranged in spherical heads and curved, flat, leathery pods.

== Description ==
Acacia brownii is an erect or spreading shrub that typically grows to a height of 0.3 to 1 m (1 ft 0 in to 3 ft 3 in) and has glabrous to sparsely hairy branchlets. Its phyllodes are more or less rigid, straight, round or four-angled in cross section, sharply-pointed 8–20 mm (0.31–0.79 in) long and up to about 1 mm (0.039 in) wide with awl-shaped stipules at the base and a pronounced mid-rib. The flowers are arranged in a spherical head in axils on a peduncle 4–15 mm (0.16–0.59 in) long. Each head is 5–10 mm (0.20–0.39 in) in diameter with 12 to 30 bright yellow flowers. Flowering occurs from July to November, and the pods are more or less curved, flat and leathery, 15–80 mm (0.59–3.15 in) long and 3–5 mm (0.12–0.20 in) wide.

This wattle is similar to A. ulicifolia, but is a sprawling, semi-prostrate shrub less than 1 m (3 ft 3 in) high, with linear phyllodes 8–25 mm (0.31–0.98 in) long with a pronounced midrib, the stipules often falling off as the phyllodes mature, and bright golden to deep golden flowers.

== Taxonomy ==
The species was first formally described by Robert Brown in 1813 as Acacia acicularis, in Hortus Kewensis but the name was illegitimate. In 1817 Poiret published Mimosa brownei as a replacement name and in 1821 Ernst Gottlieb von Steudel transferred Poiret's Mimosa brownei to Acacia as A. brownii in Nomenclator Botanicus.

The specific epithet (brownii) honours Robert Brown.

== Distribution and habitat ==
Heath wattle grows on sandy or clay loam in dry sclerophyll forest, woodland or heath in southern and eastern Victoria, New South Wales and Queensland. It is found throughout the Great Dividing Range from around the Grampians in Victoria in the south through New South Wales and up to around Burra Burri in Queensland.

== See also ==
- List of Acacia species
