= Diamond Tree =

Giant Karri tree in Western Australia

Coordinates: 34°20′07″S 116°08′20″E

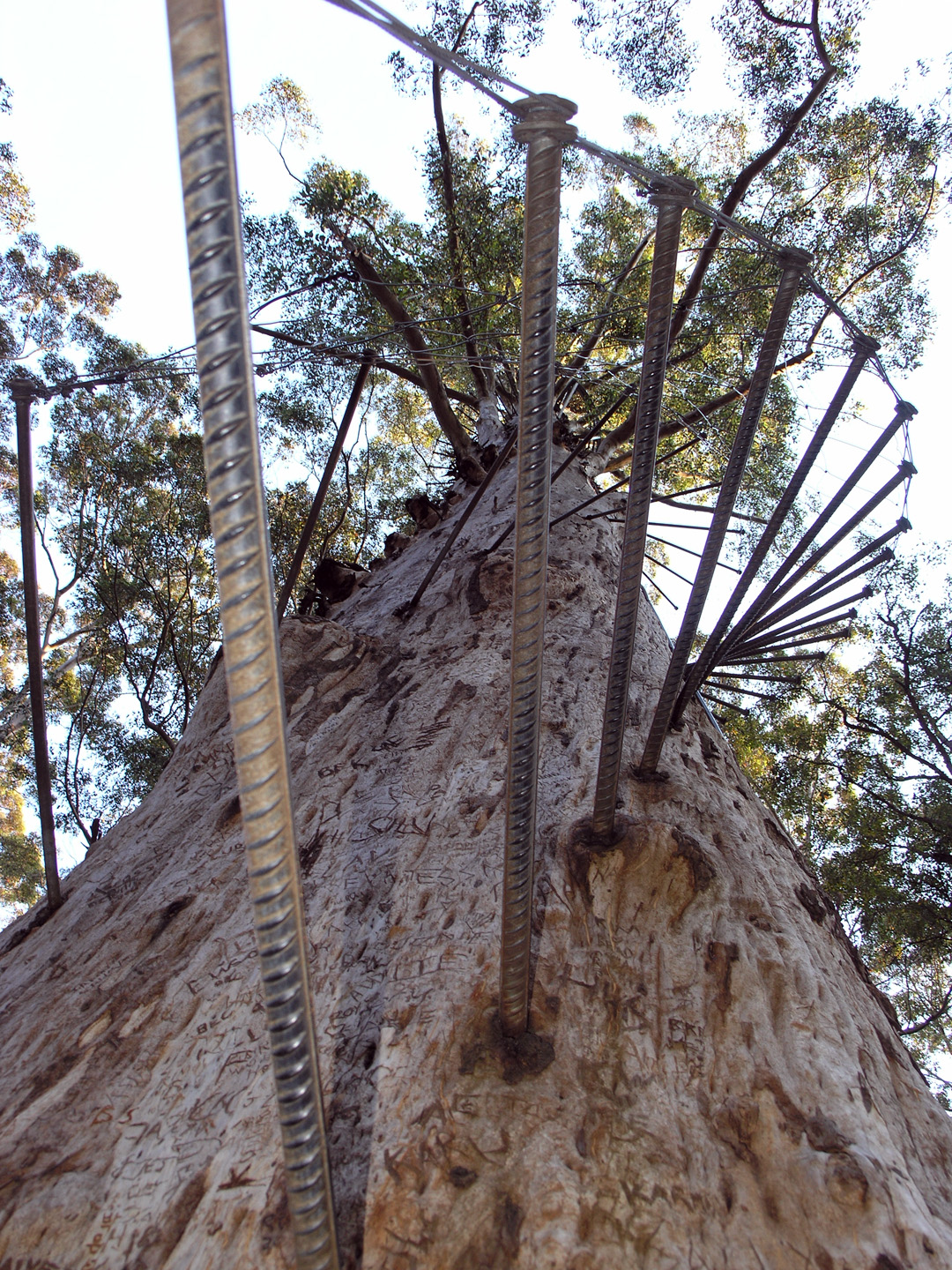
The Diamond Tree

The Diamond Tree is a giant karri tree located 10 km south of Manjimup, Western Australia on the South Western Highway.

A wooden viewing platform built in 1939 is located 49 metres up, and was the oldest wooden platform fire look-out in use until its closure in 2019.

The Diamond Tree was one of three lookout trees in the southern forests and was used as a fire lookout every summer from 1941 to 1973. The tower was used by the Department of Environment and Conservation to support aerial surveillance from time to time.

The Diamond Tree was permanently closed to climbing in 2019 after expert assessments found rot in the base of the tree and recommended all climbing should cease. The Gloucester Tree and Dave Evans Bicentennial Tree were also closed in 2023, citing a need for increased safety measures. It has not been ruled out that all three trees will remain closed permanently.

== See also ==
- List of individual trees
- List of named Eucalyptus trees
