= Gloucester Tree =

Giant karri tree in Western Australia

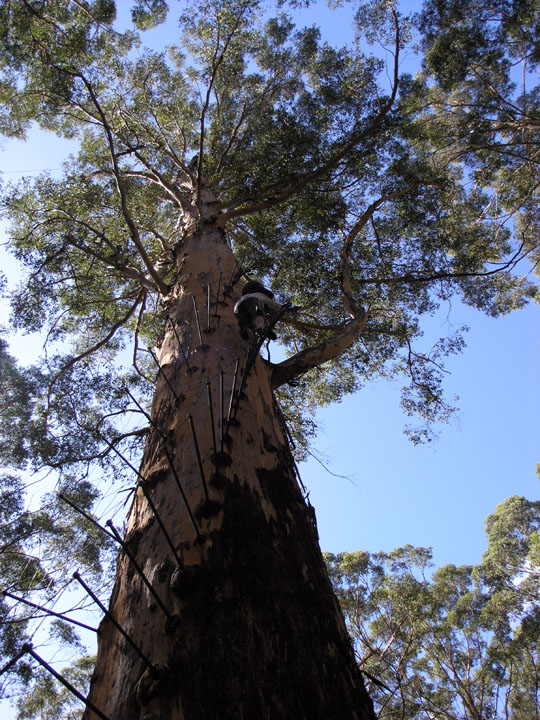
- The Gloucester Tree being climbed in 2005
- Interactive map of Gloucester Tree
- Species: Karri (Eucalyptus diversicolor)
- Coordinates: 34°26′40″S 116°3′31″E
- Height: 61 m (200 ft)

The Gloucester Tree is a giant karri (Eucalyptus diversicolor) tree located in the Gloucester National Park of Western Australia. The tree is 61 metres (200 ft) tall, and a major tourist attraction to the town of Pemberton. It is part of a group of karri tree towers open to the public, the other two being the Dave Evans Bicentennial Tree and the Diamond Tree. It is the world's second tallest fire-lookout tree, second only to the Bicentennial Tree. It was named after Prince Henry, Duke of Gloucester.

== History ==
=== As a fire-lookout tree ===
In 1947, the Gloucester Tree was selected by foresters as a fire-lookout tree. It was one of eight lookout trees built in Western Australia's South West between 1937 and 1952.

The suitability of the tree as a fire lookout was tested by forester Jack Watson, who climbed the tree using climbing boots and a belt. It took Watson six hours to climb 58 metres (190 ft), a difficult climb due to the 7.3-metre (24 ft) girth of the tree and the need to negotiate through limbs from 39.6 metres (130 ft) up. Jack Watson, a Gallipoli veteran, was also Superintendent of Kings Park in Perth, and retired from that position in 1962. Another forester, George Reynolds, pegged the ladder and lopped branches to facilitate climbing the tree, and a wooden lookout cabin was built 58 metres (190 ft) above the ground.

The Governor-General of Australia, Prince Henry, Duke of Gloucester, visited the site and watched the pegging of the tree's ladder and the lopping of branches for the lookout. Prince Henry also participated by using a wood auger to bore holes in the tree for the climbing pegs. The tree and national park are named in his honour.

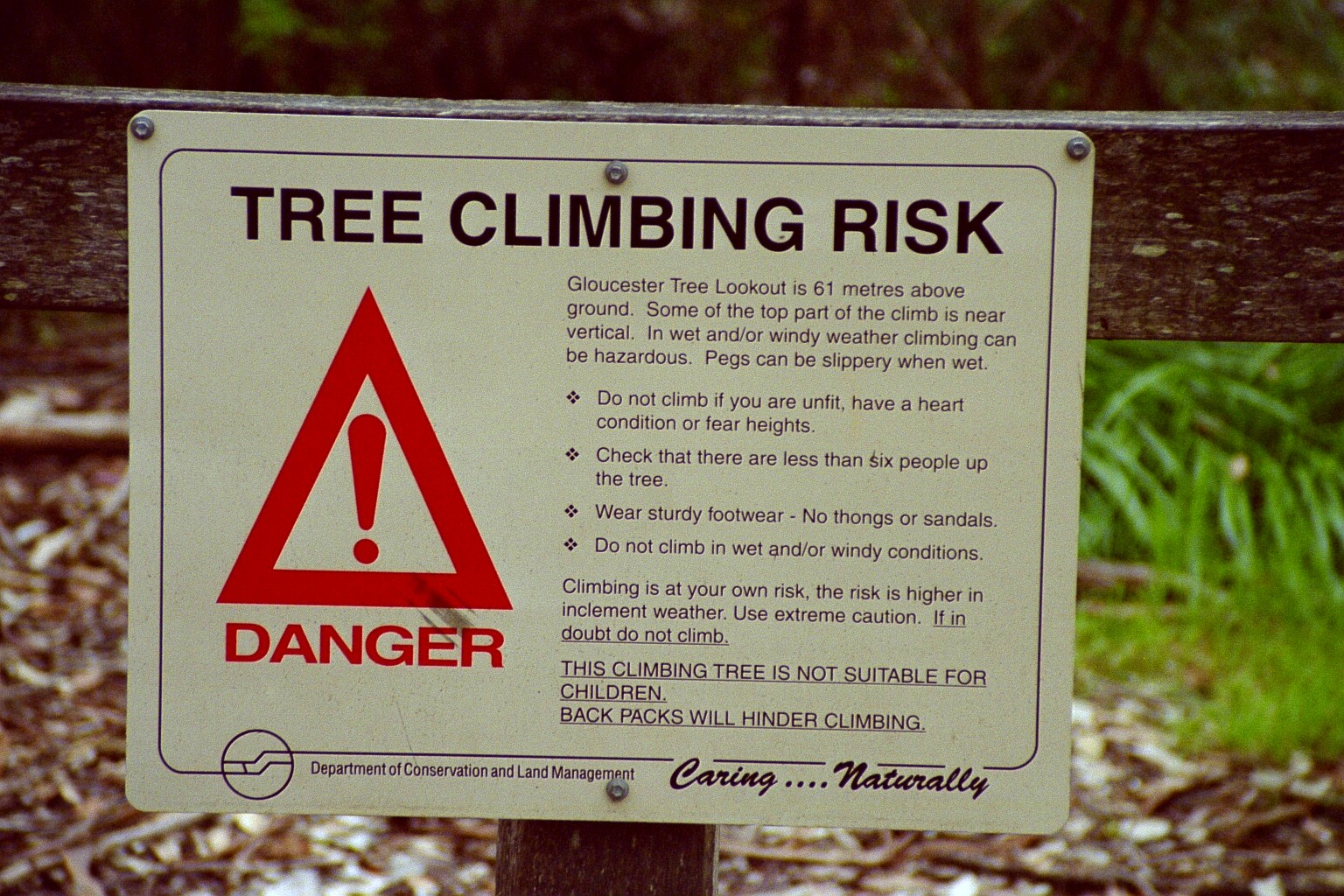
Warning sign in 2005

The wooden lookout cabin was demolished in 1973 for safety reasons, and was replaced with a steel and aluminium cabin and visitors' gallery. The climb was done by stepping on 153 spikes that spiral the tree.

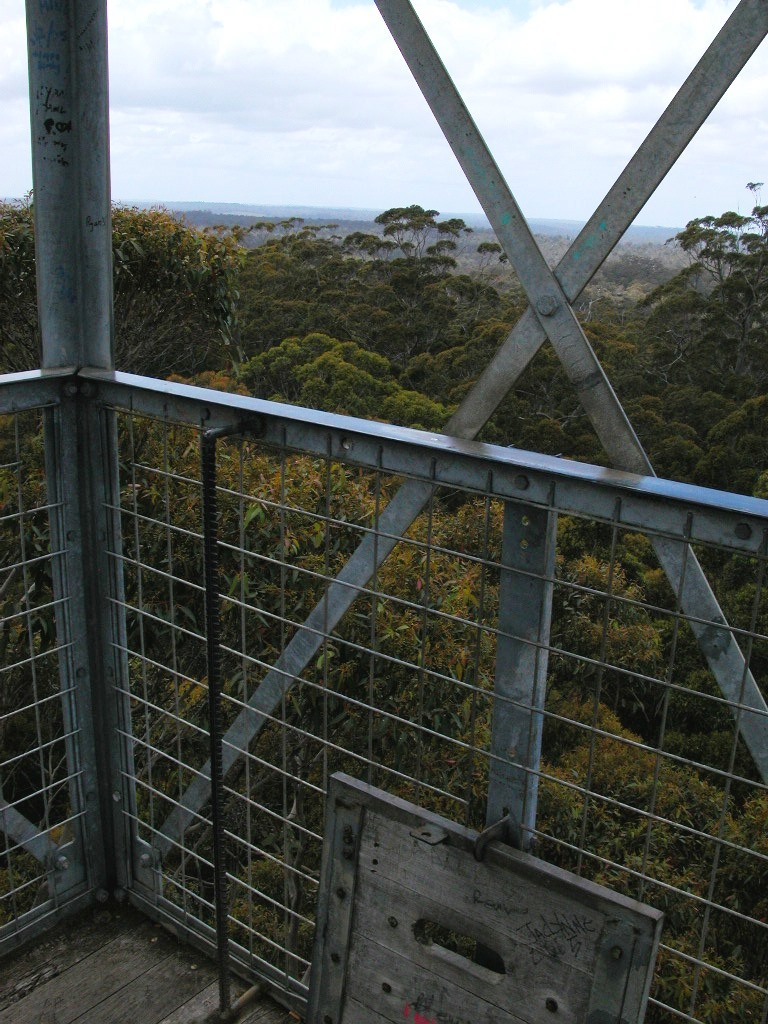
View from the top in 2005

=== Maintenance works ===
In 2023, maintenance work on the Gloucester Tree was carried out to improve the tree's safety. The work included repegging so the public could climb up to 42 metres (138 ft), although the tree remains closed due to work being needed on the tree's top and upper platform. Along with the Bicentennial Tree, it has been closed since November 2023. However, the area around the tree is still open to the public. The possibility of a permanent end to climbing the tree has not been ruled out by the Department of Biodiversity, Conservation and Attractions, but regional manager Tim Foley has said that it was something they were not keen to see. This was opposed by Louise Kingston, the Nationals MP for the South West Region, who called it "unacceptable" for the trees to be closed ahead of the summer tourist season. According to the Australian Broadcasting Corporation (ABC), there were fears among business owners that tourists would skip or spend less time in Pemberton due to the tree's closure.

In July 2026, the tree climb reopened with climbs restricted to 37 metres (121 ft) where a new viewing platform was constructed.

== Structure and dimensions ==
Before its closure, visitors could climb up 53 metres (174 ft) to its lookout. Those who climbed up were provided with no harnesses, which the ABC described as being "unique in a modern, safety-first era". When it was open, only 20 percent of visitors made the full climb to the top of the tree; most made it only part of the way before turning back.

== Gallery ==
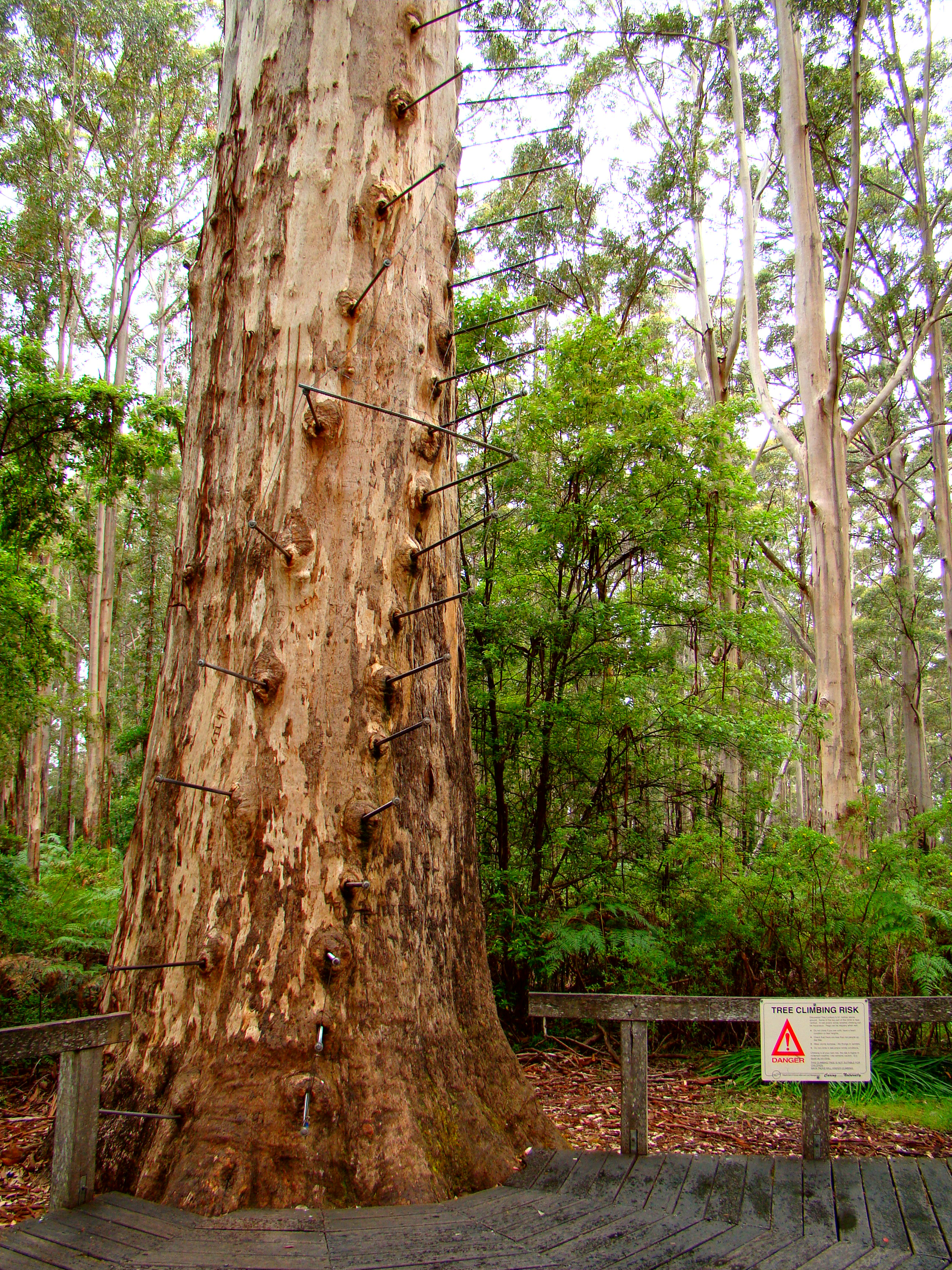
Base of the tree

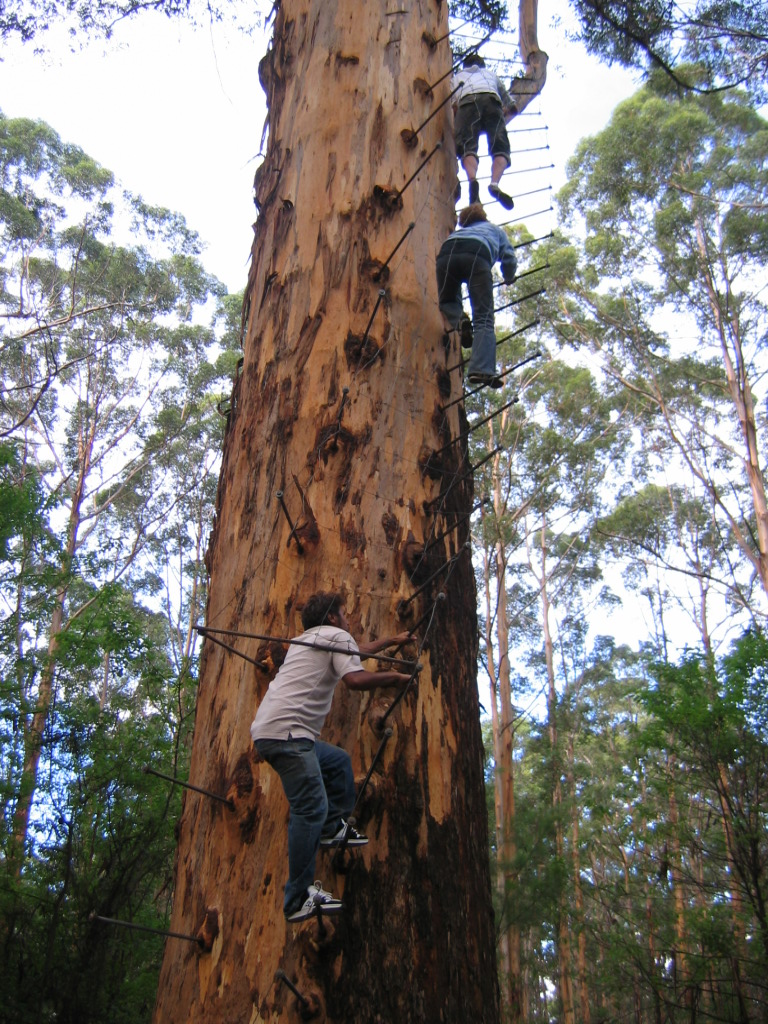
Tree being climbed

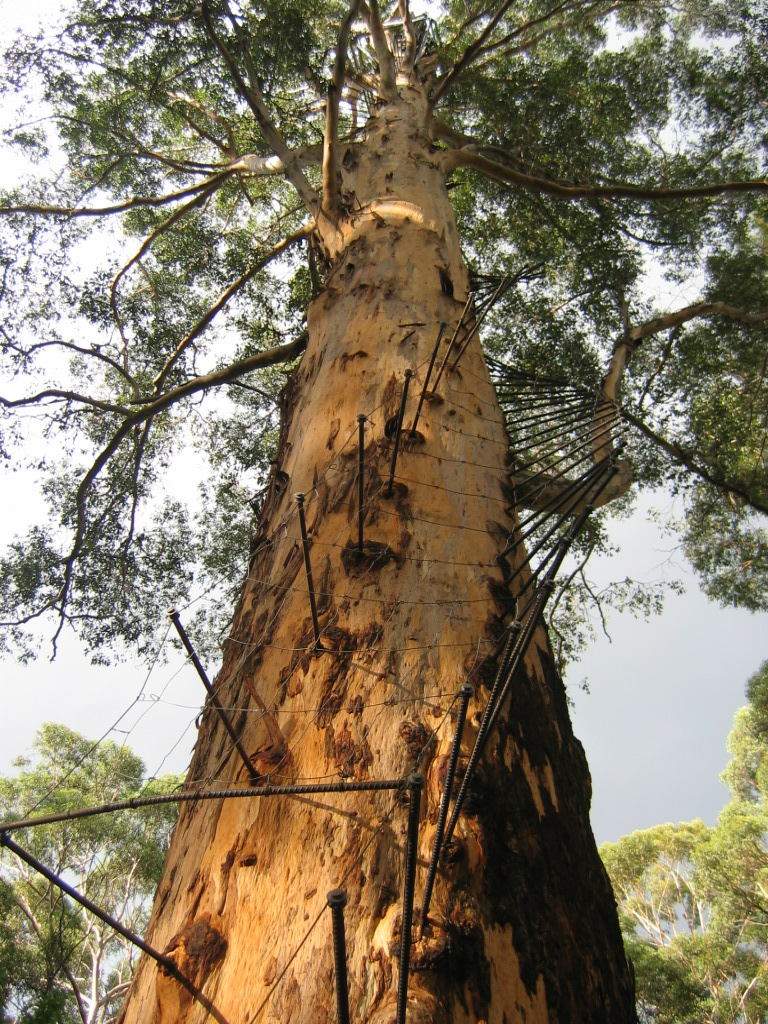
View of the ladder

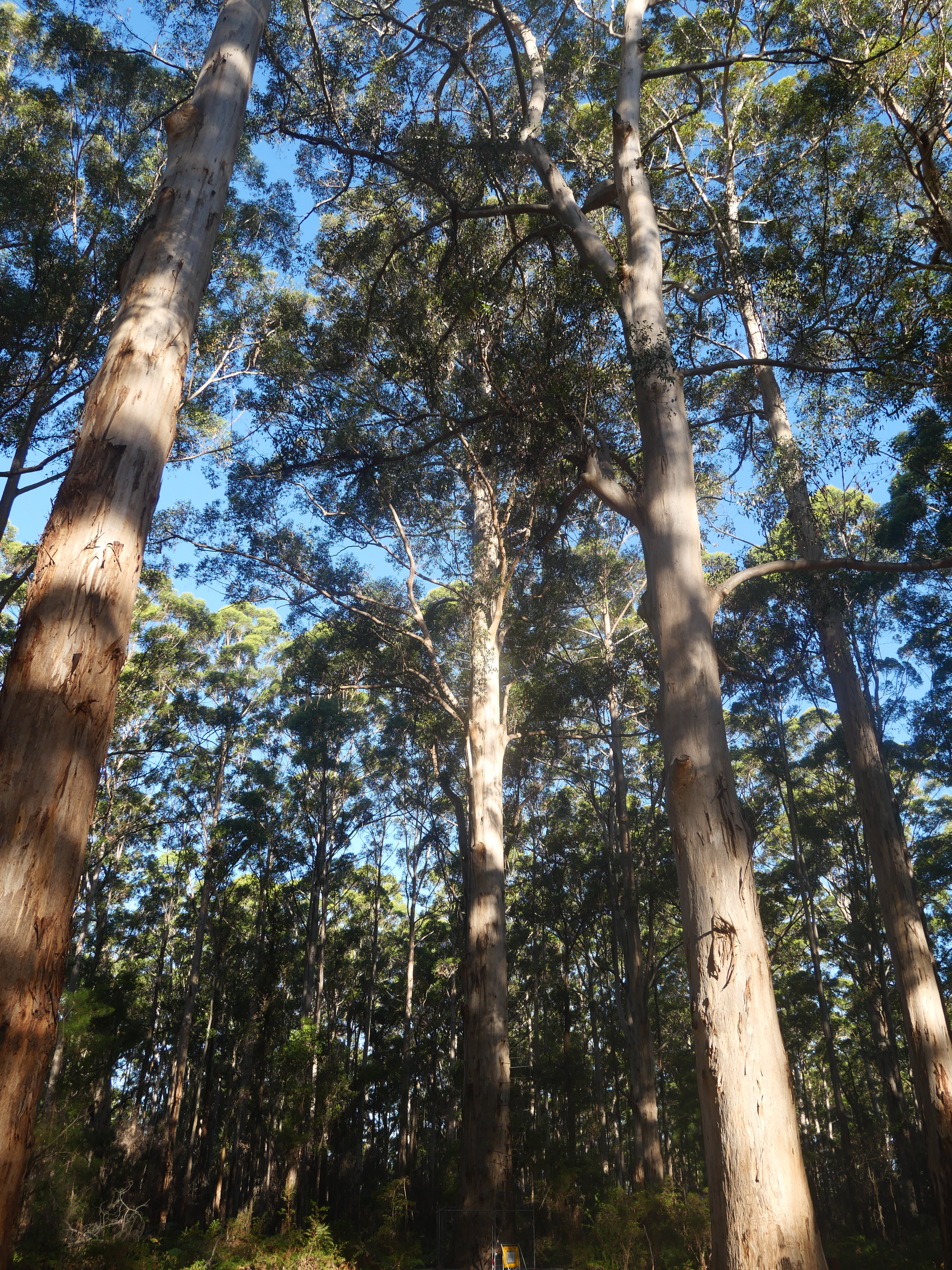
In the centre from a distance

== See also ==
- List of individual trees

== Sources ==
- Landry, Madigan (1 July 2026). "WA iconic Gloucester Tree reopens after safety upgrade". ABC News. Australian Broadcasting Corporation.
