= Dave Evans Bicentennial Tree =

Karri tree

Coordinates: 34°29′35″S 115°58′22″E

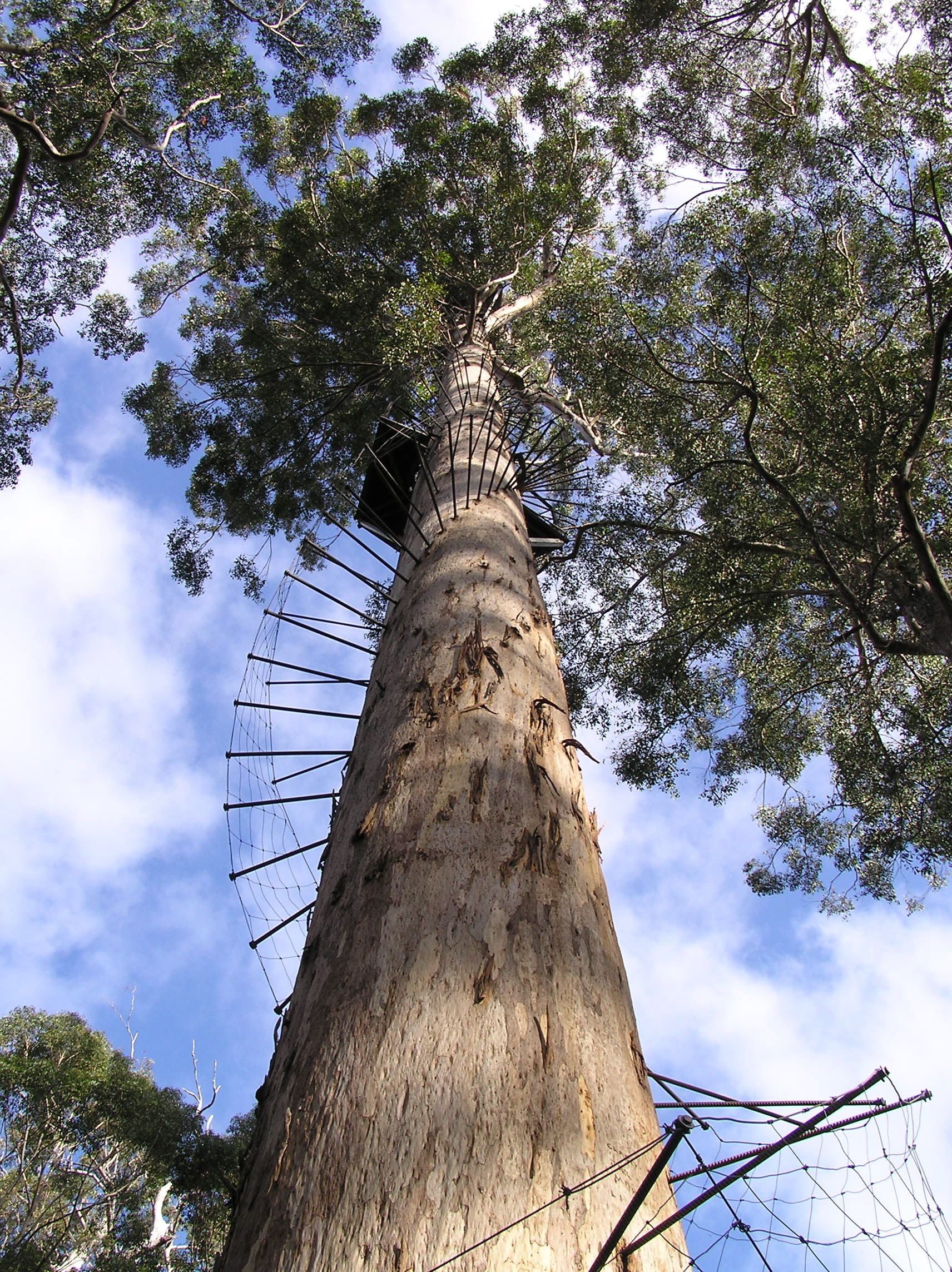
Bicentennial Tree

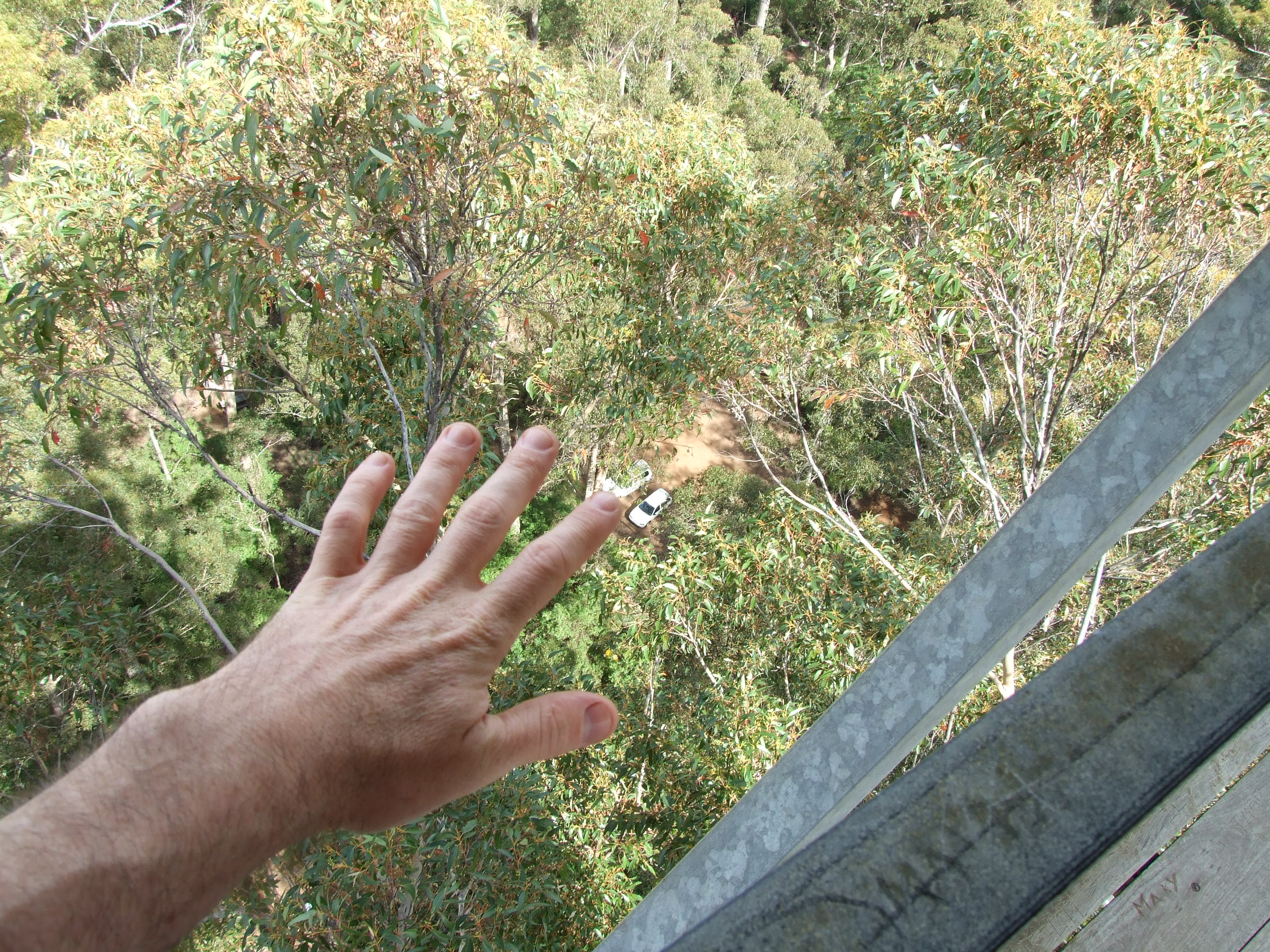
Comparative perspective of a hand and a car from the lookout

The Dave Evans Bicentennial Tree, a 75 m (246 ft) tall karri tree, was pegged for climbing to celebrate Australia's bicentenary in 1988. It is in Warren National Park in southwestern Australia. Although it has been used as a fire lookout, it is used mainly as a tourist attraction. The lookout platform was reached by climbing 165 metal spikes hammered into the trunk.

The Bicentennial Tree is one of three lookout trees, along with the Diamond and Gloucester Trees. Diamond Tree was closed in 2019. The Gloucester Tree and Bicentennial trees were also closed in 2023, citing a need for increased safety measures. It has not been ruled out that all three trees will remain closed permanently.

All three are near Pemberton, Western Australia.

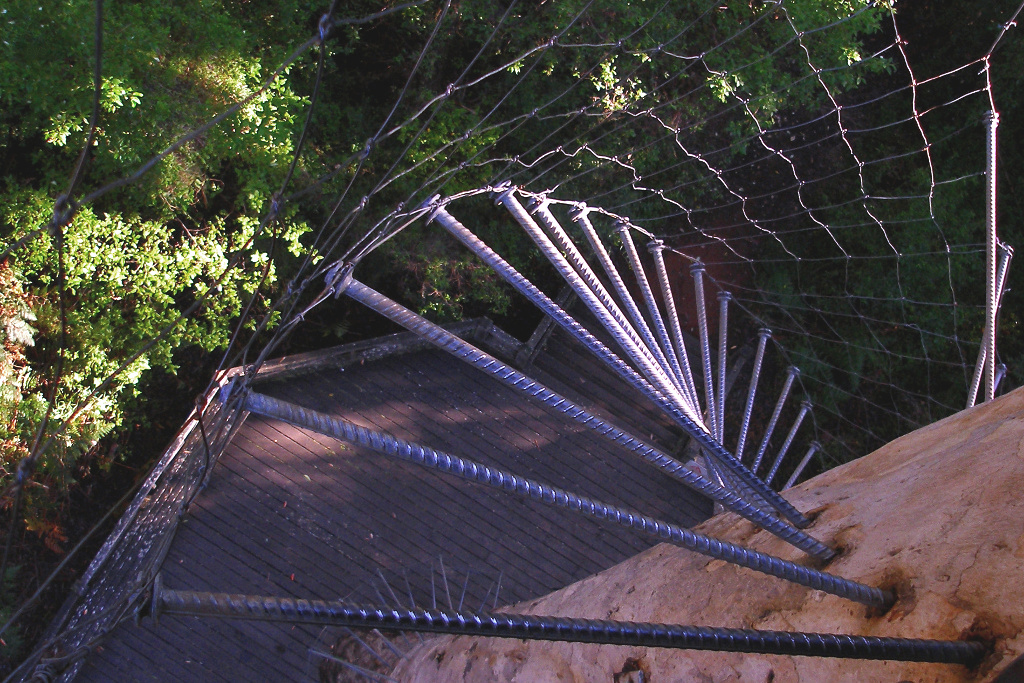
Looking down at the climbing spikes about halfway to the top

The tree was named after local politician Dave Evans.

== See also ==
- List of individual trees
- List of named Eucalyptus trees
