= South West (Western Australia) =

Region of Western Australia

- Region
- Extent of South West region
- Coordinates: 34.2°S 116.2°E
- Country: Australia
- State: Western Australia
- LGA: List; Shire of Augusta–Margaret River; Shire of Boyup Brook; Shire of Bridgetown–Greenbushes; City of Bunbury; City of Busselton; Shire of Capel; Shire of Collie; Shire of Dardanup; Shire of Donnybrook–Balingup; Shire of Harvey; Shire of Manjimup; Shire of Nannup

Government
  - State electorates: Bunbury; Collie-Preston; Murray-Wellington; Vasse; Warren-Blackwood
  - Federal divisions: Forrest; O'Connor

Area
  - Total: 23,970 km^{2} (9,250 sq mi)

Population
  - Total: 170,000
  - Density: 7.09/km^{2} (18.4/sq mi)

The South West region is one of the nine regions of Western Australia. It has an area of 23,970 square kilometres (9,250 sq mi), and a population of about 170,000 people. Bunbury is the main city in the region.

== Climate ==
The South West has a Mediterranean climate, with dry summers and wet winters. There is about 900 millimetres (35 in) of precipitation per year, with most between May and September. Mean maximum daily temperatures range from 16 °C (61 °F) in July to 34 °C (93 °F) in February.

== Economy ==
The economy of the South West is very diverse. It is a major world producer of aluminium oxide and mineral sands, and also has substantial agriculture, timber, and viticulture industries. It is Western Australia's second-most popular tourist destination after Perth.

== Local government divisions ==
The South West region consists of the following local government areas:

- Shire of Augusta–Margaret River
- Shire of Boyup Brook
- Shire of Bridgetown–Greenbushes
- City of Bunbury
- City of Busselton
- Shire of Capel
- Shire of Collie
- Shire of Dardanup
- Shire of Donnybrook–Balingup
- Shire of Harvey
- Shire of Manjimup
- Shire of Nannup

== Attractions ==
Some well-known attractions include Cape Naturaliste Lighthouse and Discovery Centre, Ngilgi Cave, Augusta Jewel Cave, Cape Leeuwin Lighthouse, Busselton Jetty, Mammoth Cave, Easter Cave, Bunbury Dolphin Discovery Centre, Dave Evans Bicentennial Tree, Diamond Tree, and Gloucester Tree.
