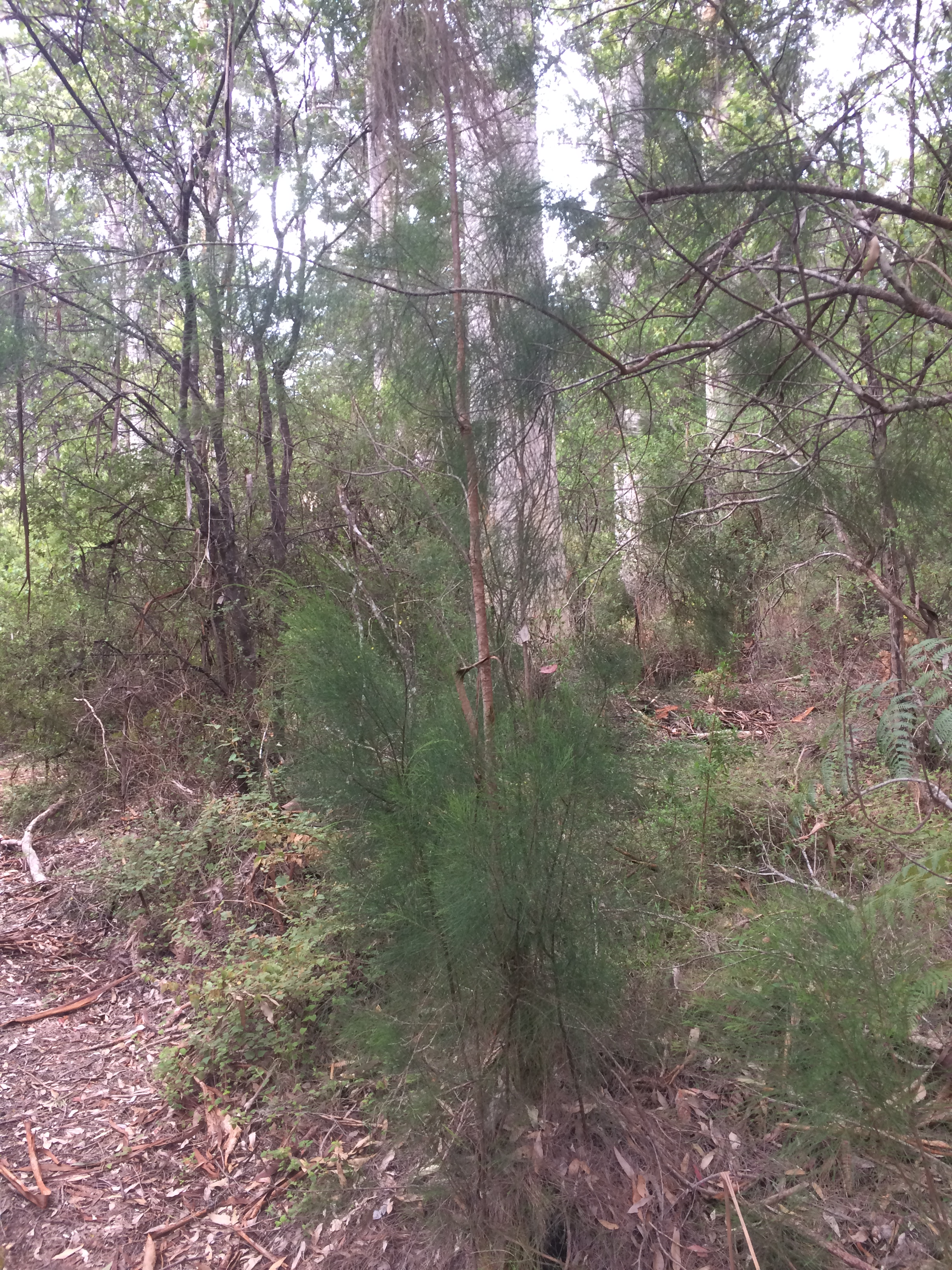

Scientific classification
- Kingdom: Plantae
- Clade: Tracheophytes
- Clade: Angiosperms
- Clade: Eudicots
- Clade: Rosids
- Order: Fagales
- Family: Casuarinaceae
- Genus: Allocasuarina
- Species: A. decussata

Binomial name
- Allocasuarina decussata (Benth.) L.A.S.Johnson
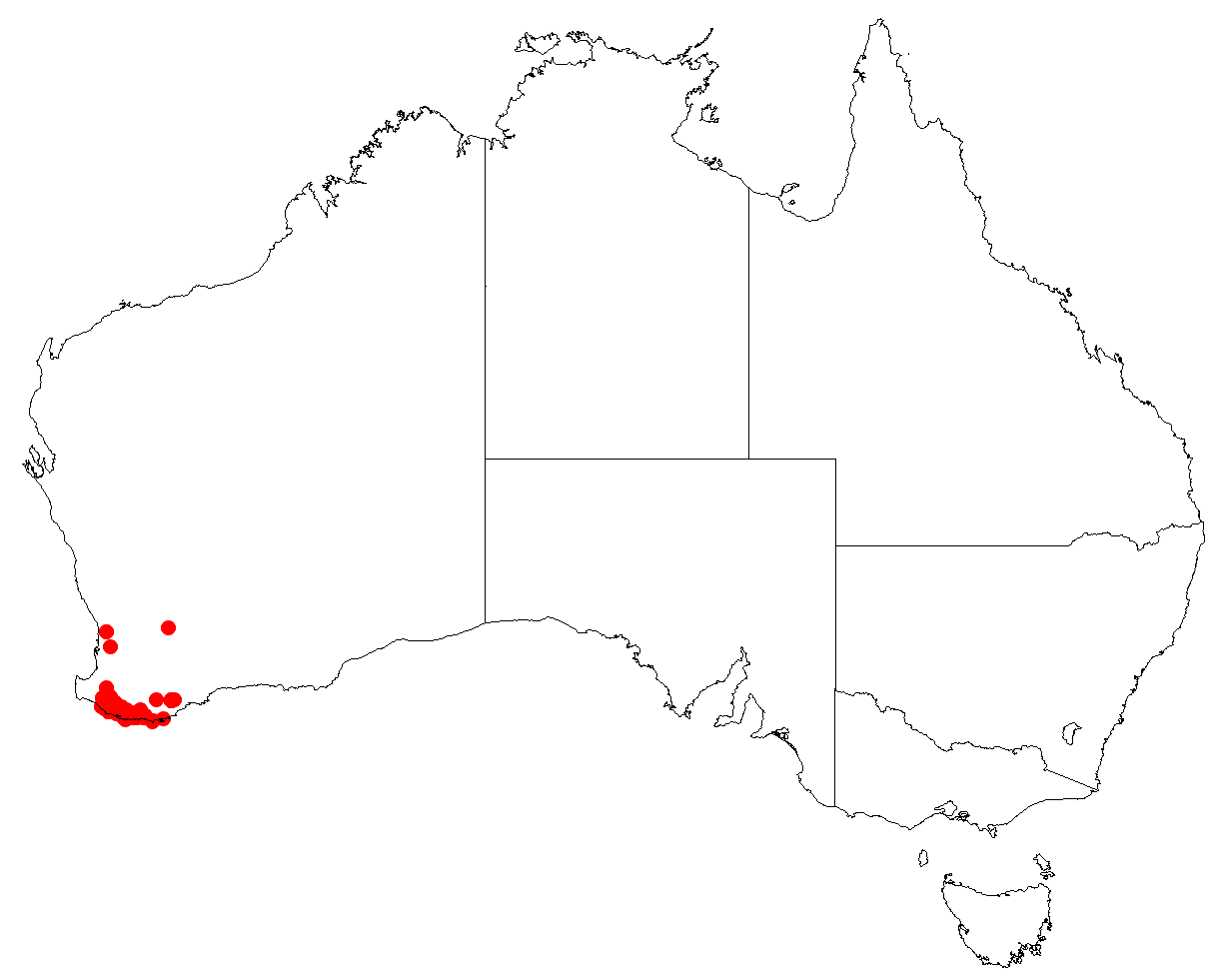
- Occurrence data from AVH

Synonyms
- Casuarina decussata Benth.

= Allocasuarina decussata =

Species of tree

Allocasuarina decussata, commonly known as karri oak or karri she-oak, is a species of flowering plant in the family Casuarinaceae and is endemic to the southwest of Western Australia. It is an understory tree in karri forest but also occurs as a stunted shrub in places like Bluff Knoll in the Stirling Range.

== Description ==
Karri oak usually grows as a medium tree 8–15 m (26–49 ft) high, although in harsh, exposed situations in places like the top of Bluff Knoll it is a stunted shrub or poorly-formed tree in shrubland. As with other members of the family Casuarinaceae, the foliage consists of wiry green branchlets called cladodes with rings of minute leaf scales. In this species, the branchlets are about 140 mm (5.5 in) long, roughly square or X-shaped in cross section, with four scale-teeth in each ring. The rings of scale-leaves are 7–9 mm (0.3–0.4 in) apart. Separate male and female flowers form on the same individual plant. The fruiting structure is a woody cone, shaped like a short cylinder with its diameter roughly equal to or slightly greater than its length. The fruit is a winged samara 7–9 mm (0.3–0.4 in) long. It often grows in association with Acacia pentadenia, and Asplenium aethiopicum often grows as an epiphyte on its branches.

== Taxonomy ==
This species was first formally described in 1873 by George Bentham in Flora Australiensis from specimens collected by James Drummond near Cape Riche, Western Australia. Bentham gave it the name Casuarina decussata. In 1982, Lawrie Johnson moved it to its current genus Allocasuarina in his revision of the she-oaks. It is closely related to A. torulosa of New South Wales and Queensland. The specific epithet decussata is a Latin word meaning 'like the letter X' or 'the Roman numeral ten'.

== Distribution and habitat ==
Karri oak is restricted to the southwest of Western Australia in the Esperance Plains, Jarrah Forest and Warren biogeographical regions. It grows on loam in the karri forest but is also found on much poorer soils in the Stirling Range.

== Cultivation and uses ==
Karri oak is not known in cultivation and there is only limited availability of timber because most trees are in national parks. Its pale reddish-brown heartwood has distinctive rays that potentially make it useful as a craft wood.

== Gallery ==
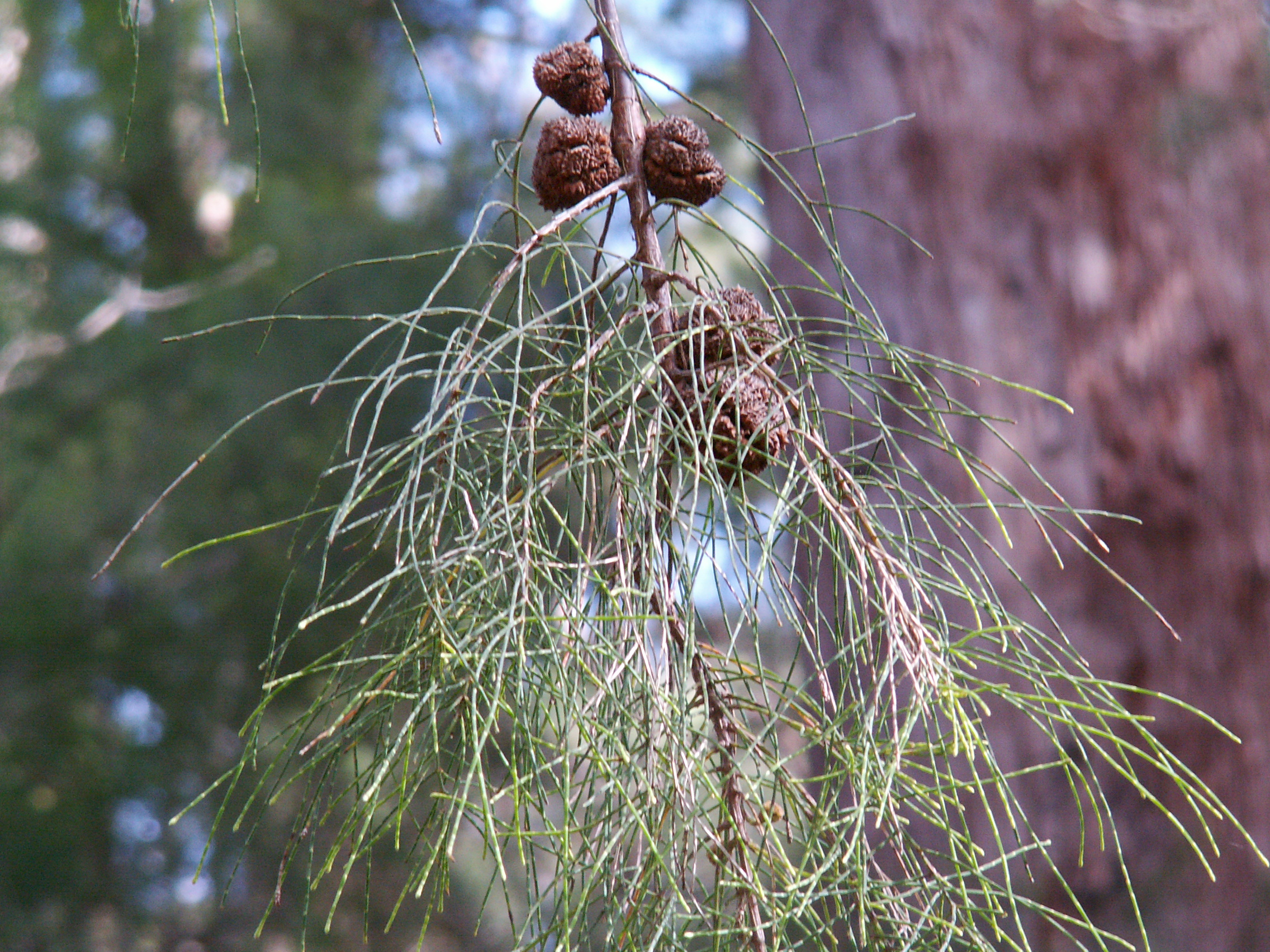
Branchlets and mature cones

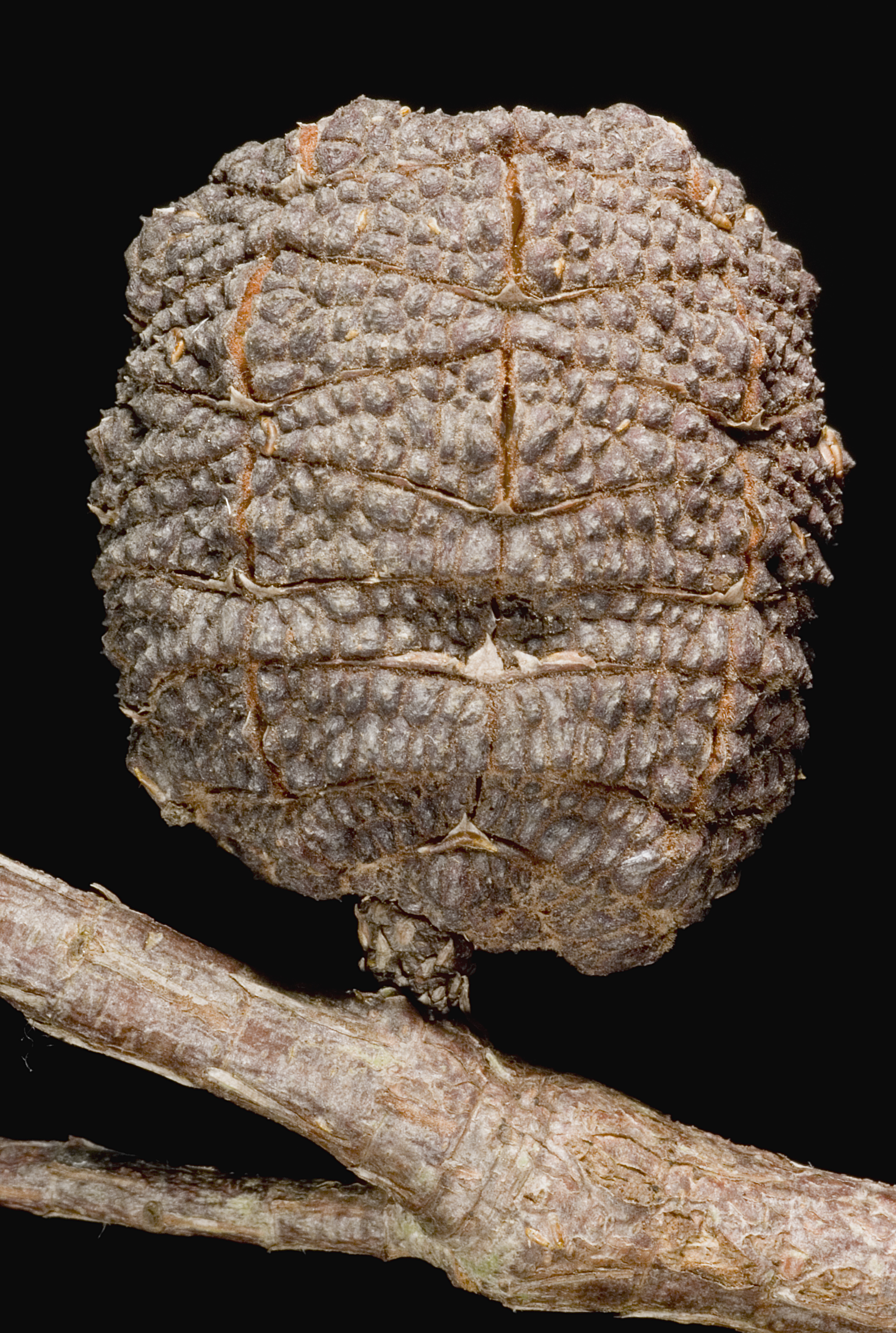
Cone detail

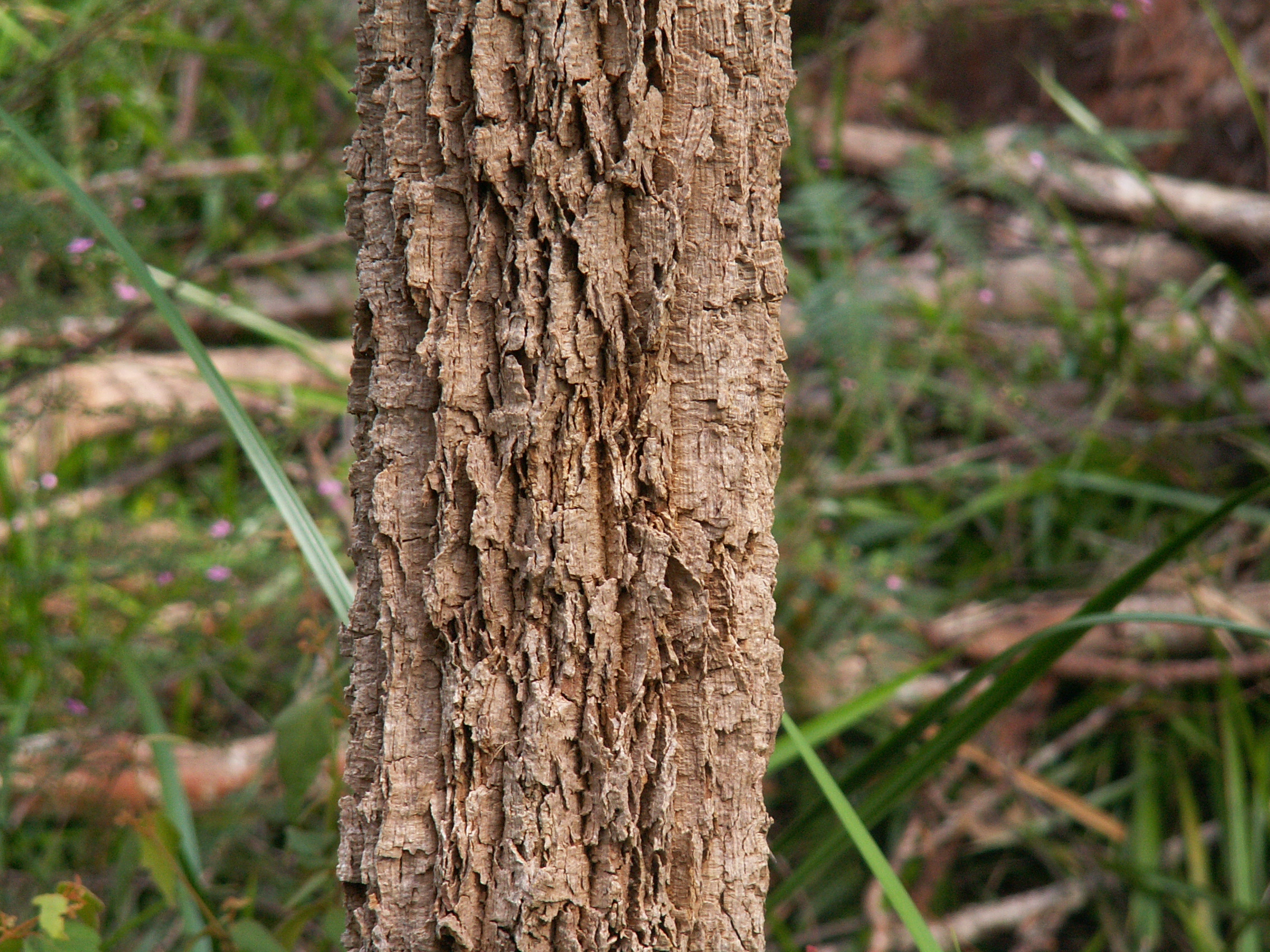
Bark of a young A. decussata in the Walpole-Nornalup National Park
