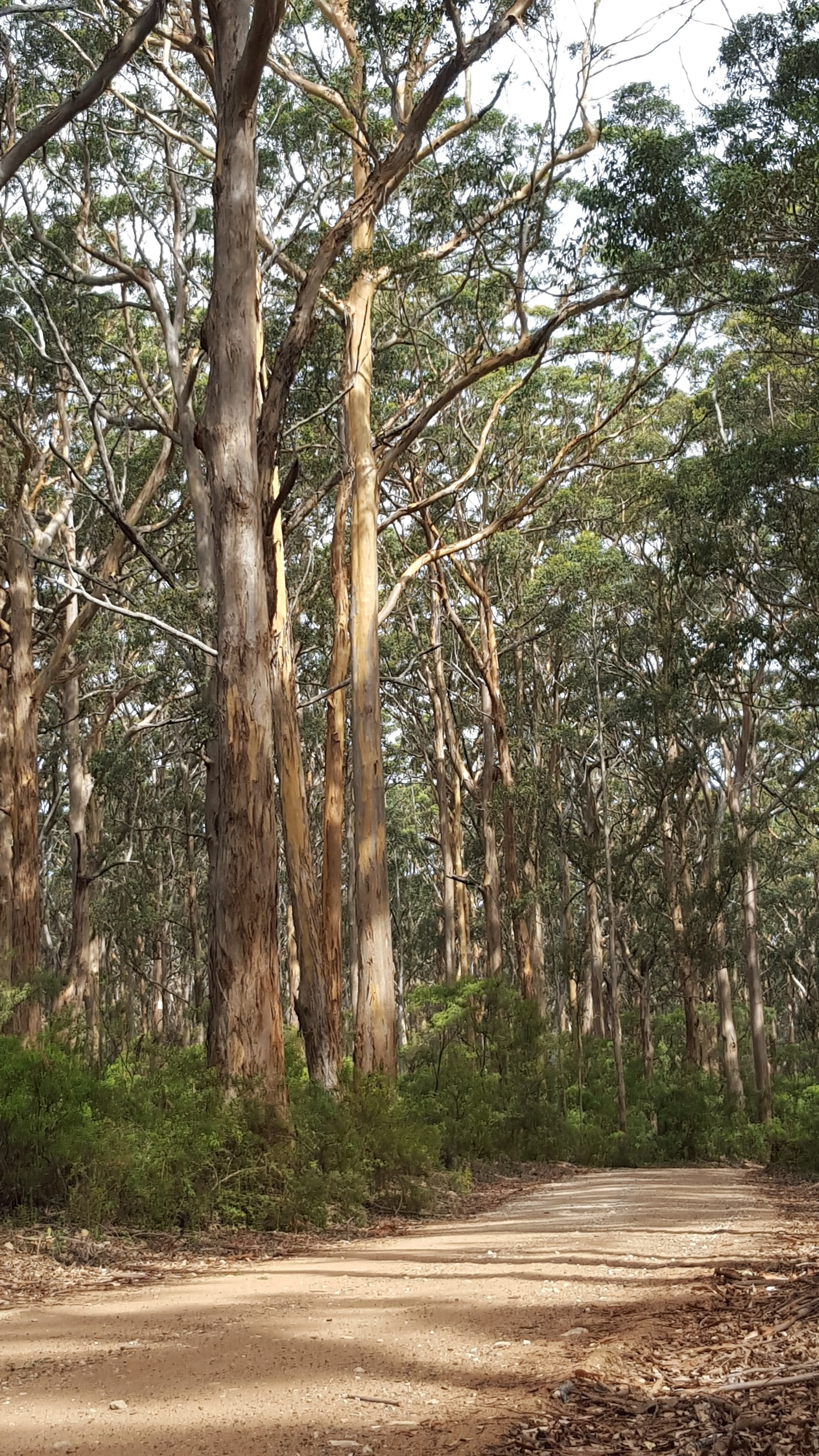
- Near Boranup

Conservation status
- Least Concern (IUCN 3.1)

Scientific classification
- Kingdom: Plantae
- Clade: Tracheophytes
- Clade: Angiosperms
- Clade: Eudicots
- Clade: Rosids
- Order: Myrtales
- Family: Myrtaceae
- Genus: Eucalyptus
- Species: E. diversicolor

Binomial name
- Eucalyptus diversicolor F.Muell.

= Eucalyptus diversicolor =

Karri

Species of eucalyptus endemic to Western Australia

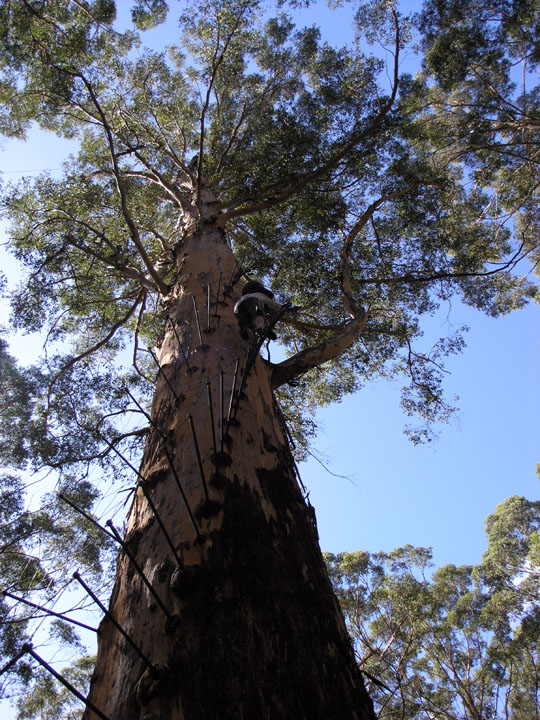
The Gloucester Tree

Eucalyptus diversicolor, commonly known as karri, is a species of flowering plant in the family Myrtaceae and is endemic to the south-west of Western Australia. It is a tall tree with smooth light grey to cream-coloured, often mottled bark, lance-shaped adult leaves and barrel-shaped fruit. Found in higher rainfall areas, karri is commercially important for its timber.

== Description ==
Eucalyptus diversicolor is the tallest tree that grows in Western Australia. It is a tall forest tree that typically grows to a height of 10–60 m (33–197 ft) but can reach as high as 90 m (300 ft), making it the tallest tree in Western Australia and one of the tallest in the world. As of February 2019, the tallest known living karri is just over 80 m (260 ft) tall. A tree south of Pemberton, known as 'The Tyrant' is 69 m (226 ft) tall and 11.5 m (38 ft) in girth and contains approximately 220 m^{3} (7,800 cu ft) of wood in its trunk and is thought to be the largest karri by wood volume. A Eucalyptus diversicolor of 72.9 m (239 ft) height and of 5.71 m (18.7 ft) girth in Coimbra, Portugal, is the tallest reliably measured tree in Europe.

Karri do not form a lignotuber but do form epicormic buds located under the bark along the length of the stem.

The bark on the trunk and branches is smooth, grey to cream-coloured or pale orange, often mottled and is shed in larger plates, short ribbons or small polygonal flakes. The bark sheds each year with the new white bark contrasting with the orange to yellow new bark contrasts against the recently exposed white bark. The bark becomes increasingly granulated with age. The bark is rich in tannins.

The stems and branchlets are round in cross section, the branchlets have no oil glands in the pith.

The leaves on young plants and on coppice regrowth are arranged in opposite pairs, broadly egg-shaped to almost round, paler on the lower surface, 50–155 mm (2.0–6.1 in) long, 25–100 mm (0.98–3.94 in) wide and petiolate. The leaves tend to be more spreading than pendulous. Adult leaves are arranged alternately, glossy dark green on the upper surface, paler below, lance-shaped, 70–135 mm (2.8–5.3 in) long and 15–37 mm (0.59–1.46 in) wide on a flattened or channelled petiole 10–20 mm (0.39–0.79 in) long. The leaves are penniveined, where the veins arise pinnately, in a feather like arrangement, from a single primary vein. The leaves are densely reticulated where the network of veins within the leaf is packed closely together. The prominent vein near the margin of the leaf is very close to the margin and runs almost parallel with it. The yellow oil glands within the leaves are situated in centre of the smallest unreticulated areas. The fine lateral nerves spread at a wide angle from the midrib.

The unbranched inflorescences are situated in the axils in small clusters on a common stalk. The flower buds are arranged in groups of seven in leaf axils on a rounded peduncle 12–30 mm (0.47–1.18 in) long, each bud on a pedicel 3–6 mm (0.12–0.24 in) long. The buds are oval, 11–16 mm (0.43–0.63 in) long and 5–7 mm (0.20–0.28 in) wide at maturity with a conical operculum. Flowering has been observed in January, April, May, August and December, and the flowers are white. The flowers have narrow cylindrical calyx tubes that slowly taper to the base into the pedicel. The many stamen form a continuous ring and has inflected white coloured filaments. The anthers at the end of the filaments have an oblong shape and open into a parallel longitudinal slits.

The fruit is a woody barrel-shaped capsule 10–12 mm (0.39–0.47 in) long and 8–10 mm (0.31–0.39 in) wide on a pedicel 5–6 mm (0.20–0.24 in) long with three valves at or below rim level.

The seeds found within the fruits have a flattened ovoid shape, are grey in colour with a length of 1.2 to 3 mm (0.047 to 0.118 in). The seeds are pointed at one end with a smooth back and a scar from where it was once attached to the placenta on the underside.

The species has a haploid chromosome number of 12.

== Taxonomy ==
Eucalyptus diversicolor was first formally described in 1863 by the botanist Ferdinand von Mueller in his book Fragmenta Phytographiae Australiae. The type specimen was collected in 1860 by the botanist Augustus Frederick Oldfield near Wilson Inlet; the location given, in Latin, is In Australiae regionibus depressioribus quam Maxime austro occidentalibus.

The holotype is held at Royal Botanic Gardens Victoria, syntypes are held at Cambridge University Herbarium, Royal Botanic Garden Edinburgh and Royal Botanic Gardens, Kew.

The botanical name diversicolor is taken from the Latin word diversus meaning to turn apart and color or "separate colours" and refers to the difference between the top of the leaf and its underside. The common name is derived from the Noongar name for the tree karri pronounced ka-ree.

Karri is a part of the Symphyomyrtus subgenus, all of which have two opercula on the buds and have four rows of ovules. It is not closely related to any other members of the subgenus and is the sole species in the section Inclusae. The defining feature of this section is having inflexed stamens, flattened ovoid seed shape, enclosed valves of the fruit and the lack of pith glands in the branchlets. Although it has no closely related species it has some affinity with tall Eucalypts found the wet forests of eastern Australian including E. saligna and E. grandis all of which have discolorous adult leaves and seeds with a flattened-ovoid shape.

== Distribution and habitat ==
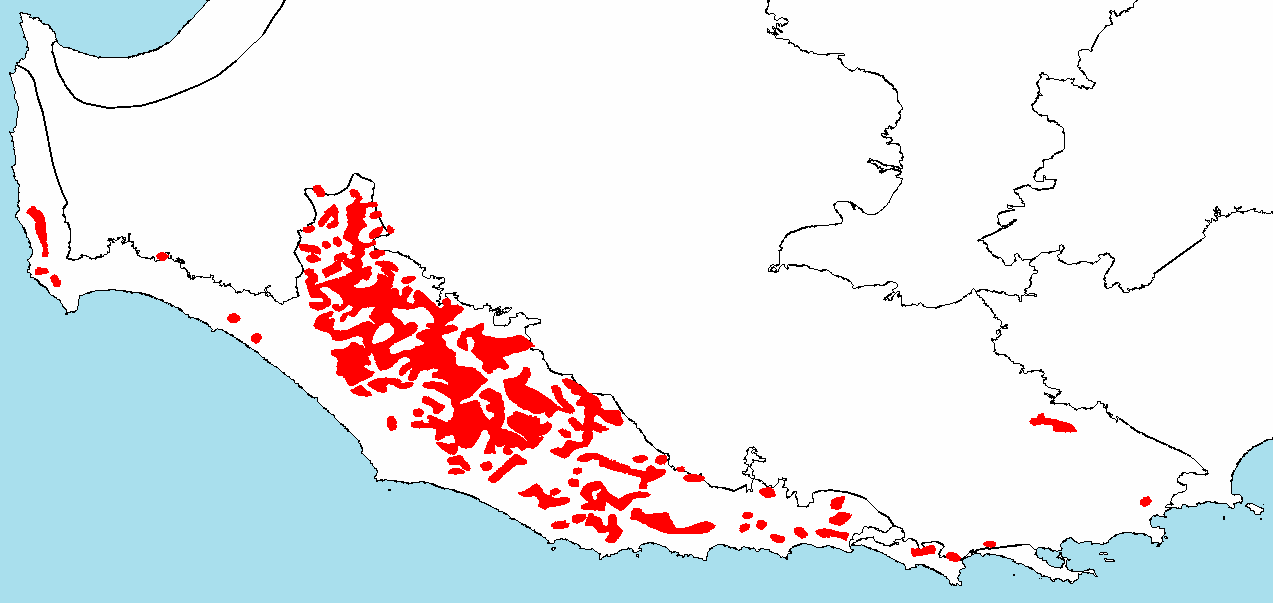
Distribution

The climate over the range of the tree is mildly temperate with small variations in humidity and temperature with frosts only occurring on rare occasions. Karri occurs only within the High Rainfall Zone of the South West Botanical Province of Western Australia which receives 900 to 1,300 millimetres (35.4 to 51.2 in) of rain per year, mostly in winter. It mostly occurs within the Warren biogeographic region, but there are some outlying populations including the Porongorup Ranges, Mount Manypeaks, Torbay, Rocky Gully all along the south coast and Karridale and Forest Grove to the north west and the Leeuwin-Naturaliste Ridge to the south of Margaret River to the west of the main belt.

The heart of the karri forest is found near Nannup and Manjimup through to Denmark.

The total area covered by karri forest is less than 200,000 hectares (494,211 acres) which is about one fifth of its virgin growth. The nearest tall tree forests are some 3,000 kilometres (1,864 mi) to the east in Tasmania and Victoria.

Karri has been introduced to parts of Africa including; Kenya, Tanzania and the Canary Islands.

The species is considered invasive in South Africa where it is a problem in the Western Cape region and is locally known a karie. It commonly invades clearings, fynbos, water courses and road sides often out competing local species and is spread easily by seed dispersal.

== Ecology ==
Karri is regarded as one of the six forest giants found in Western Australia; the others being Corymbia calophylla (marri), Eucalyptus gomphocephala (tuart), Eucalyptus jacksonii (red tingle), Eucalyptus marginata (jarrah) and Eucalyptus patens (yarri).

Some karri specimens are thought to reach an age of up to 300 years. The soil in which the species grows is often poor, and the tree tends to flower after fire to take advantage of the nutrients released by the combustion of forest litter. The soil is classified as karri loam. Though low in some minor nutrients it is admired for its depth and pasture-growing properties. The depth of the soil is several metres and thought to be created primarily from the bark shed by the tree, which collects at the trunk base to a depth upwards of six metres in mature trees. The karri supports an extensive ecosystem which is connected to the granite outcrops of the lower south-west and the many subsequent creeks and rivers created from runoff. Karri generally dominate in the deep valleys between granite outcrops surrounding the creeks and rivers.

A dense understorey is found in karri forest areas which retains moisture over the hot summers. Associated trees and shrubs found in the understorey include the peppermint (Agonis flexuosa), karri sheoak (Allocasuarina decussata), karri wattle (Acacia pentadenia) and karri oak (Chorilaena quercifolia). A diverse assemblage of flowers and smaller plants – around 2,000 plant taxa – make up the mosaic of habitats within the karri forests.

The tree has a complex floral cycle and it takes four to five years from the production of flowers to the seeds being released. The production of seed is dependent on a multitude of variables including tree density, availability of pollinators, soil moisture, genetics, nutrients and fire.

=== Pollinators ===
Most Eucalypts achieve pollination through insects and birds rather than wind. Insects are far less active through the colder winter months so bird pollination is thought to be more important. The trees are often visited by nectar feeding birds, particularly Purple-crowned lorikeets. The lorikeets have a wide range and are quite active during winter and are thought to be dominant pollinators and able to cross pollinate over larger distances. Karri is a source of pollen for honeybees (Apis mellifera). The pollen has a protein content of 23.4% and provides sufficient amino acids for the nutrition of A. mellifera. The content of some of the amino acids are; 3.84% proline, 2.07% glutamic acid, 1.72% lysine, 1.22% cystine, 1.91% aspartic acid, 1.50% leucine, 1.11% alanine and 1.11% valine.

== Uses ==
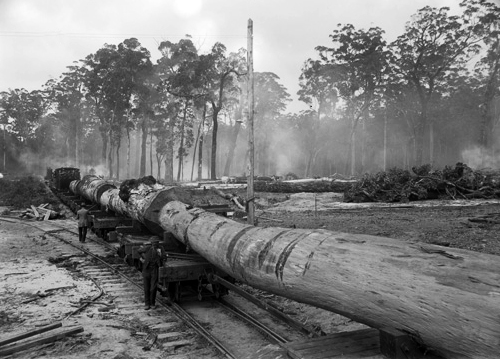
Deanmill karri logs on train

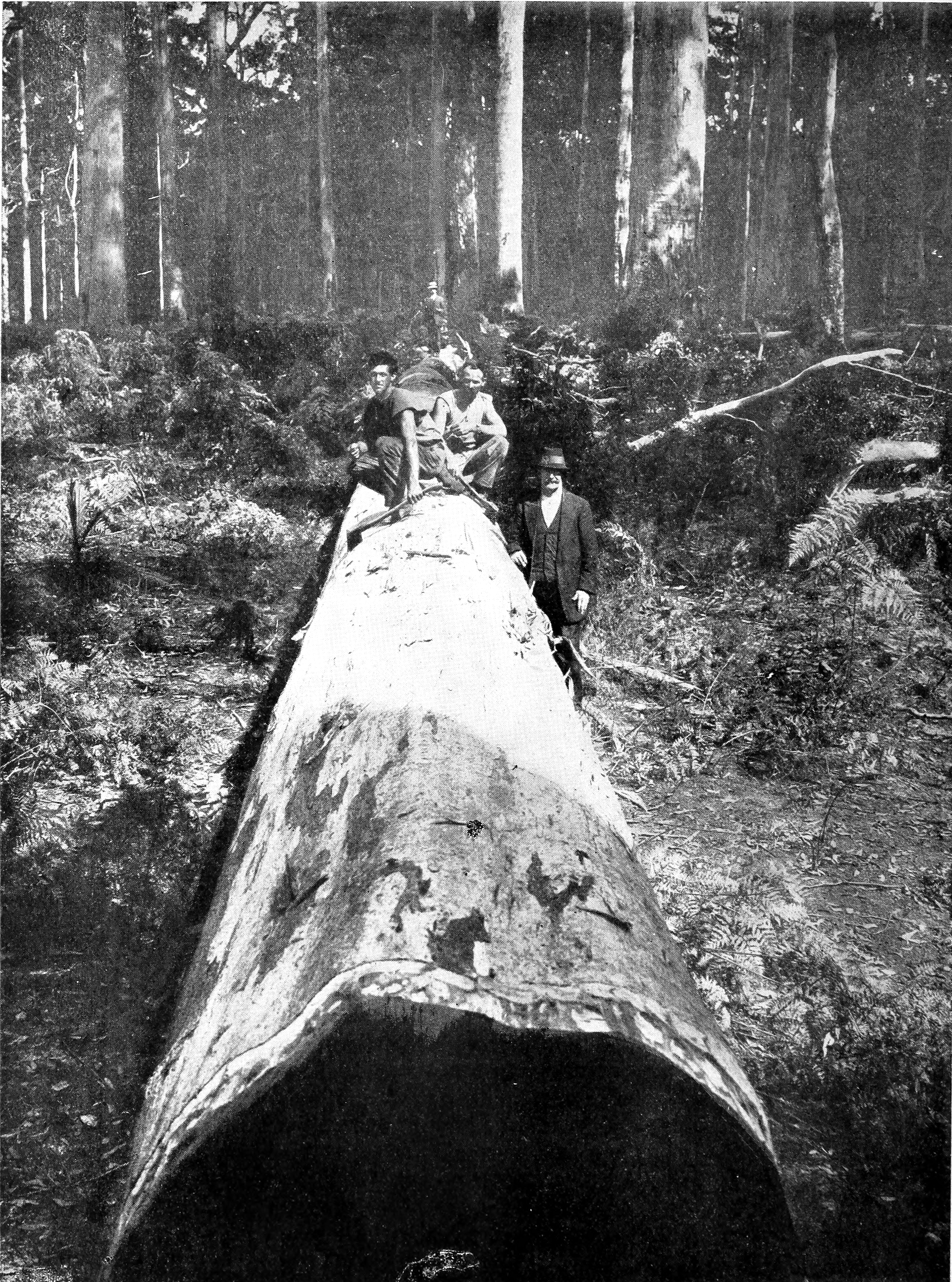
'Log and fallers.' Poole, C. E. L., Primer of Forestry 1922

The wood has a green density of around 1,200 kilograms per cubic metre (75 lb/cu ft) with an air-dried density of about 900 kilograms per cubic metre (56 lb/cu ft). The heartwood of Karri is a red colour and closely resembles jarrah heartwood. Bushmen used to tell the two timbers apart by burning a splint of wood, Karri would leave a white ash and jarrah would leave a grey to black coloured ash. Timber from Karri is suitable for construction work. It is a little more dense than jarrah but is much stronger. Karri wood is not as termite resistant as that of jarrah. The tree has been logged since the settlement of Western Australia with logging towns appearing throughout the range of the tree and producing hardwood timbers, mostly for construction purposes, for the first 150 years since settlement. The first Karri timber to be felled for export was at the isolated population around Leeuwin, which became known as Karridale. The virtues of the wood were promoted in the 1920s by the state conservator of forests, Charles Lane-Poole, who noted the colonists' preference for other timber as its vulnerability to white ants made it a poor choice for fence posts and railway sleepers. The timber found uses in the state for wagon spokes and wooden pipes, and in England it was found suitable for scantlings by the national railway and telegraph arms by the postal services and was listed among Lloyds shipbuilding timbers as possessing great strength over large lengths.

Fire lookouts were established in the forests using the tallest Karri trees, giving the foresters a commanding view of the landscape. The idea of using karri trees in this way was first suggested in 1937 by a young forester, Don Stewart, who later became Conservator of Forests. The first of these was built on a large marri (Corymbia calophylla) at Alco, near Nannup. Eight lookouts were established in the forests between 1937 and 1952. Spotter planes are now used and some of the trees are now used as tourist attractions.

Karri wood is a beautiful mahogany colour, lighter in colour than jarrah. It is used extensively in the building industry, particularly in roofs for the length and knot-free quality of the boards. The wood is also used for flooring, furniture, cabinetry and plywood. The heartwood is golden to reddish brown, often with an orange or purple cast, and tends to darken with age. It has an interlocked grain with a uniform medium-coarse texture. It has the reputation of being termite-prone, although it is nowhere near as susceptible to these insects as pine. It is durable against rot. It is also an excellent furniture wood.

Some of the main streets of early Sydney were paved with blocks of Karri but have been long since covered by asphalt. The wood was also sent to London for the same purpose.

Karri honey is widely sought after for its clarity, light color and delicate flavor. In 1952 it was estimated that 25% of honey produced in Western Australia was produced in Karri forests. Tourism to this area is also supported by the Karri. Main honey flows occur every four to five years with even larger flows every fifteen years or so.

== See also ==
- Gloucester Tree, a famous karri tree in Western Australia that has a platform 61 m (200 ft) above ground level
- Dave Evans Bicentennial Tree
- Diamond Tree
- List of tallest trees
- Warren (biogeographic region), also known as the Karri Forest Region.

=== Gallery ===
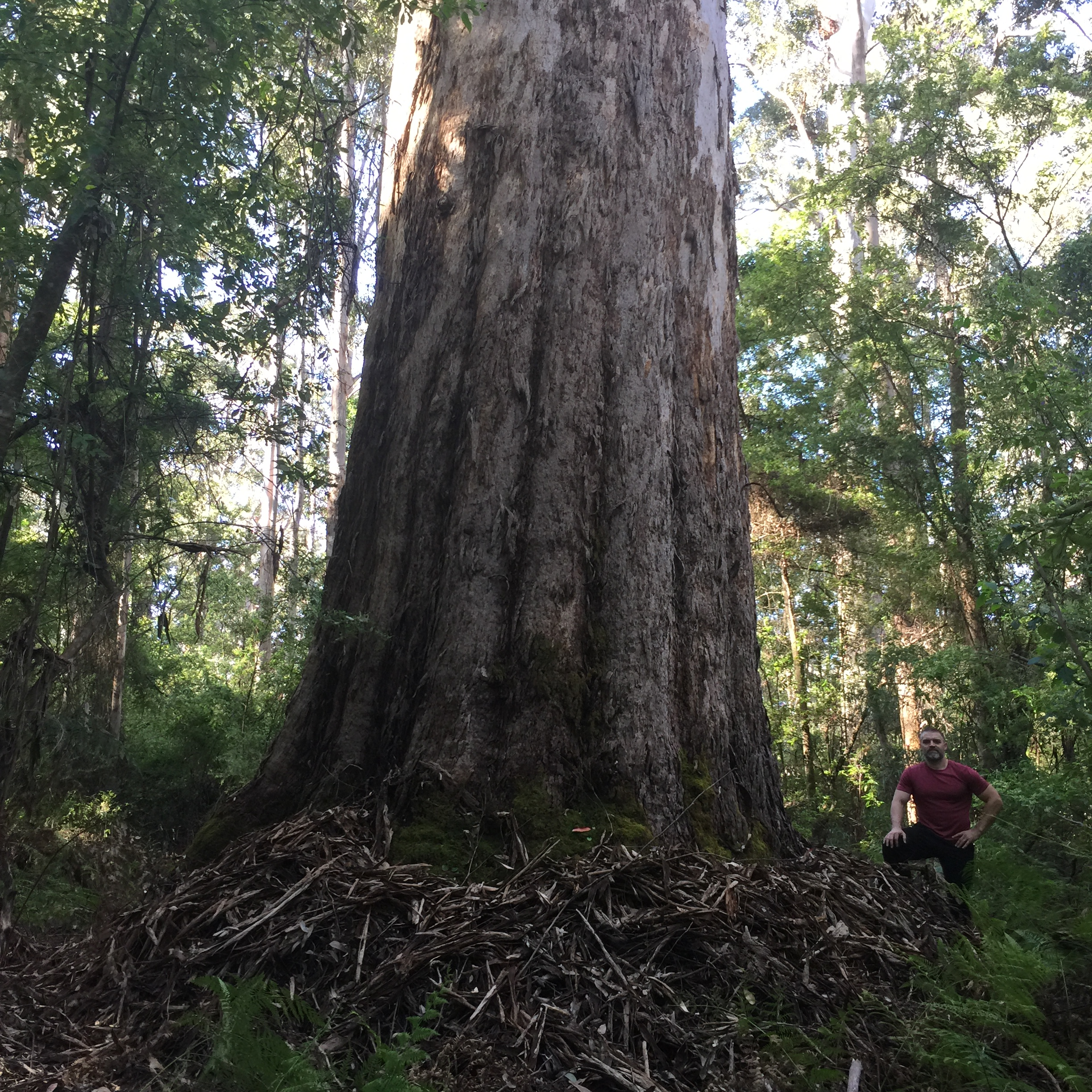
The Tyrant, the largest karri

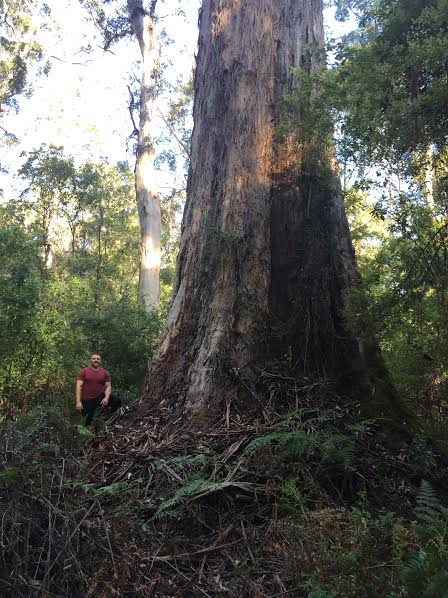
The Hawke Tree has the largest diameter for a karri

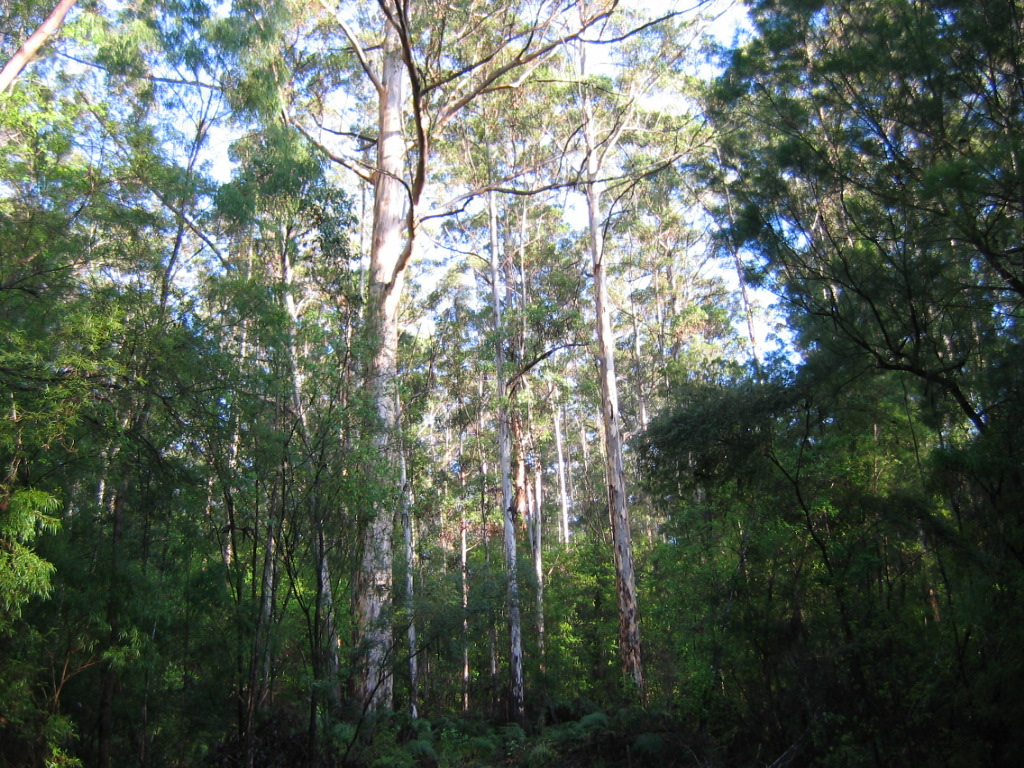
Karri forest around Pemberton

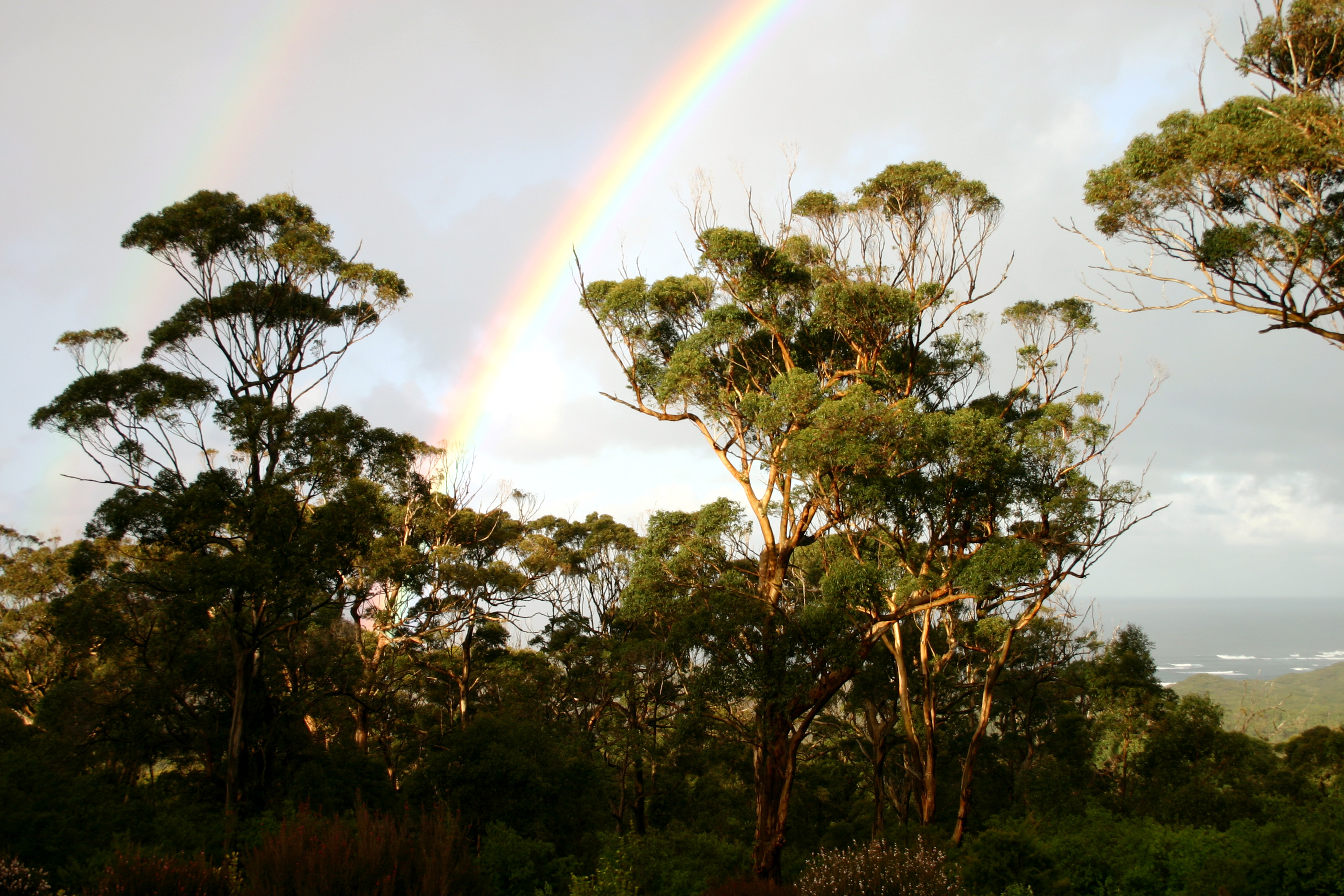
Karri trees near Denmark WA

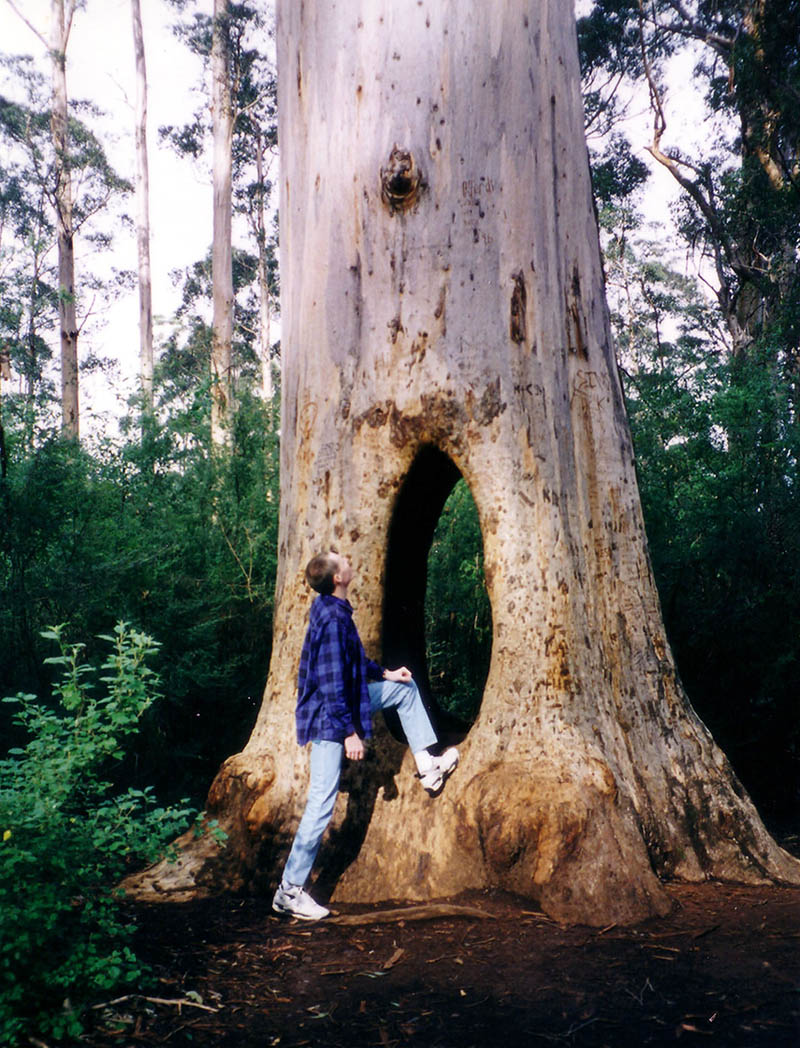
Walk Through Karri tree in Beedelup National Park
