= List of State Register of Heritage Places in the Shire of Manjimup =

List of heritage sites in Western Australia

The State Register of Heritage Places is maintained by the Heritage Council of Western Australia. As of 2026, 272 places are heritage-listed in the Shire of Manjimup, of which 16 are on the State Register of Heritage Places.

== List ==
The Western Australian State Register of Heritage Places, as of 2026, lists the following 16 state registered places within the Shire of Manjimup:

Place name	Place #	Street number	Street name	Suburb or town	Co-ordinates	Notes & former names	Photo
Dingup Anglican Church	1505		Balbarrup Road	Balbarrup	34.236876°S 116.206236°E	St. Thomas' Church	
Jardee School (former)	1506	Lot 555	Tynans Road	Jardee	34.285609°S 116.121467°E		
St Erney's Homestead	1510		Parsons Road	Quinninup	34.402701°S 116.260352°E		
St Mark's Anglican Church	1511		Wheatley Coast Road	Upper Warren	34.345695°S 116.277366°E	Upper Warren School	
Pemberton Uniting Church	1522	38	Brockman Street	Pemberton	34.446035°S 116.033231°E	Methodist	
Mill Workers' Hall	1523	Lot 278	Brockman Street	Pemberton	34.447119°S 116.030136°E		
Rockbridge, Upper Warren	1729	222	Rockbridge Road	Upper Warren	34.389737°S 116.245084°E		
Store, Northcliffe	3142		Wheatley Coast Road	Northcliffe	34.63158°S 116.123709°E	Giblett and Johnston's Northcliffe Trading Co, The Northcliffe Craft Store, Environment Cent	
Pemberton-Northcliffe Railway & Railway Station	4637			Pemberton to Northcliffe	34.53752°S 116.025139°E	Pemberton to Northcliffe Railway, Pemberton Tramway & Railway Station	
Manjimup Infant Health Centre (former)	11375	Corner	Rutherford & Moore Streets	Manjimup	34.238976°S 116.142864°E		
Pemberton Timber Mill Workers' Cottages Precinct	11381		Brockman Street, Broadway Street, Karri Rise, Dean Street, Kelly Street, Pine Street	Pemberton	34.447989°S 116.033945°E		
Pemberton Swimming Pool	11383		Swimming Pool Road	Pemberton	34.441702°S 116.031854°E	Pemberton Pool	
Warren River Railway Bridge, Picton to Northcliffe Railway	15404			Collins	34.498304°S 116.05326°E		
Watermark Kilns, Northcliffe	16654	Lot 12152	Karri Hill Road	Northcliffe	34.55404°S 116.181493°E	Tobacco Kilns	
Jardee School House	24709		Tynans Road	Jardee	34.286218°S 116.122576°E	Teachers Quarters	
Mill Manager's House	25015		Karri Rise	Pemberton	34.448296°S 116.032771°E		
