= Diamond Tree, Western Australia =

Locality in the Shire of Manjimup, Western Australia

Diamond Tree
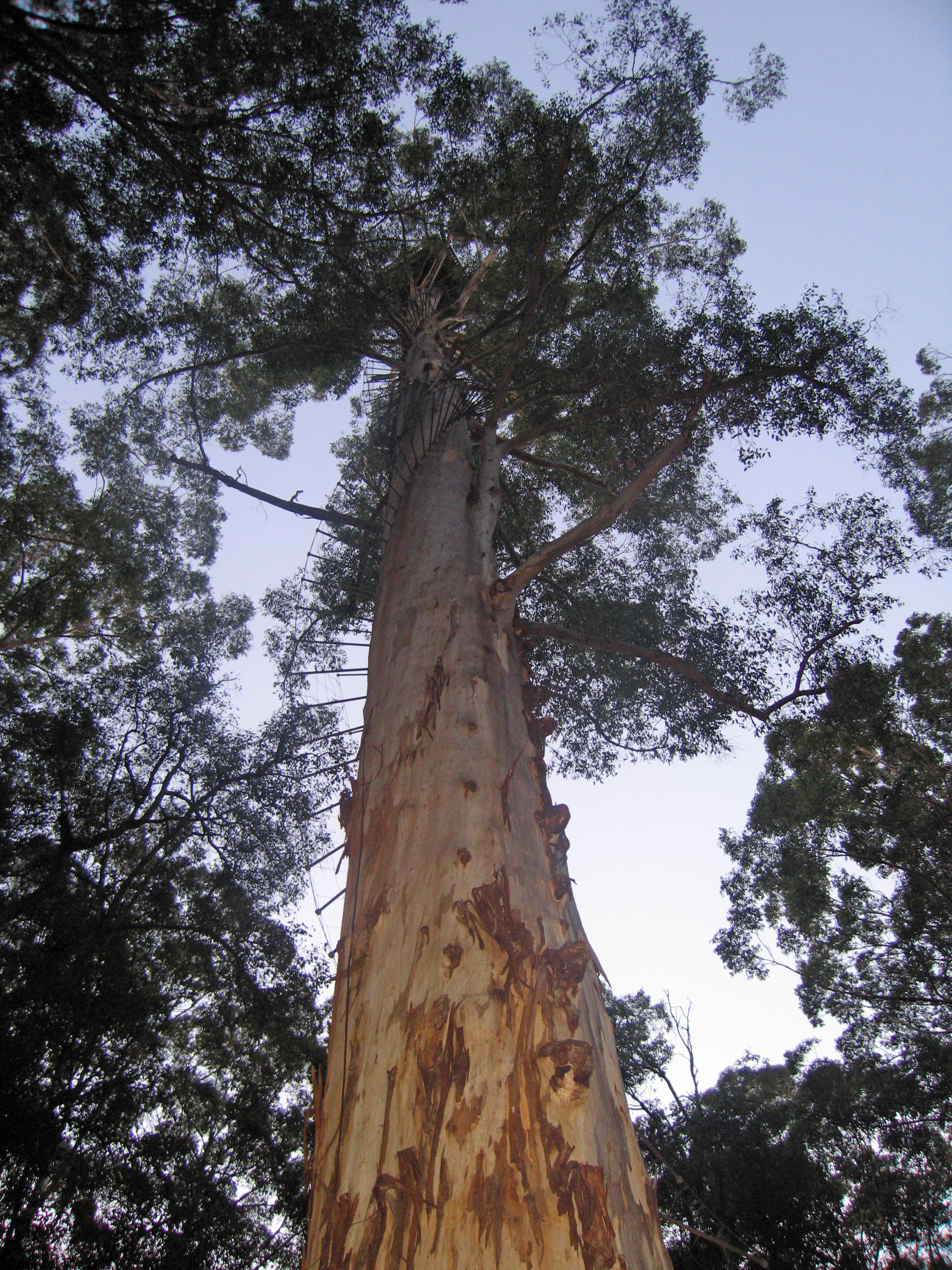
- The Diamond Tree

- Interactive map of Diamond Tree
- Coordinates: 34.34610°S 116.11279°E
- Country: Australia
- State: Western Australia
- LGA: Shire of Manjimup
- Location: 265 km (165 mi) from Perth; 10 km (6.2 mi) from Manjimup

Government
  - State electorate: Warren-Blackwood
  - Federal division: O'Connor

Area
  - Total: 40.3 km^{2} (15.6 sq mi)

Population
  - Total: 28 (SAL 2021)
- Postcode: 6258
Localities around Diamond Tree
Jardee	Jardee	Middlesex
Channybearup	Diamond Tree	Smith Brook
Eastbrook	Eastbrook	Collins

Diamond Tree is a rural locality of the Shire of Manjimup in the South West region of Western Australia. The South Western Highway forms the eastern border of the locality while the Vasse Highway forms its south-eastern one. Parts of the Sir James Mitchell National Park are also located within Diamond Tree.

The heritage listed Diamond Tree, with its former fire lookout tower, is located in the north-east of the locality. It was used as a fire lookout from 1940 to 1974, with the lookout at a height of 54 metres (177 ft).

The locality of Diamond Tree is located on the traditional land of the Bibulman people of the Noongar nation.

The locality was a stop on the Northcliffe branch railway.
