= Crowea, Western Australia =

Locality in the Shire of Manjimup, Western Australia

Crowea
- other
- Coordinates: 34.54377°S 116.10760°E
- Country: Australia
- State: Western Australia
- LGA: Shire of Manjimup
- Location: 296 km (184 mi) from Perth; 41 km (25 mi) from Manjimup; 19 km (12 mi) from Pemberton

Government
  - State electorate: Warren-Blackwood
  - Federal division: O'Connor

Area
  - Total: 264.1 km^{2} (102.0 sq mi)

Population
  - Total: 97 (SAL 2021)
- Postcode: 6262
Localities around Crowea
Yeagarup	Collins	Quinninup
Callcup	Crowea	Quinninup
Meerup	Boorara Brook	Shannon

Crowea is a rural locality of the Shire of Manjimup, located near Northcliffe, in the South West region of Western Australia. The South Western Highway forms the eastern border of the locality while the Warren River forms most of its northern border. Parts of the Greater Hawke National Park, in the west, and Greater Dordagup National Park, in the east, are located in Crowea while a small section of Jane National Park penetrates into the south of the locality.

== History ==
Crowea is located on the traditional land of the Bibulman people of the Noongar nation.

The Northcliffe branch railway once passed through the locality, with the stops of Warren Bridge, Yeagarup, Dombakup and Terry all located in Crowea. The Warren River railway bridge, located on the border of Crowea and Collins but listed under Collins, of the Northcliffe branch railway is listed on the Western Australian State Register of Heritage Places. After closure of the line, the bridge was the stopping place for the shorter run of the Pemberton-Northcliffe Railway from Pemberton, of the Pemberton Tramway Company. The heritage assessment for the bridge deemed it to be the most impressive bridge on the line, being 127 metres long, 10 metres high and constructed in 1930. The Warren River was repaired in 1961, after suffering fire damage and, again, from 1972 to 1973.

A second railway bridge over the Warren River, also on the boundary of Crowea and Collins, was subsequently used as a road bridge, is on the shire's heritage list, and is now used as crossing on the Bibbulmun Track.
