= Upper Warren, Western Australia =

Locality in the Shire of Manjimup, Western Australia

Upper Warren
- other
- Coordinates: 34.36228°S 116.33575°E
- Country: Australia
- State: Western Australia
- LGA: Shire of Manjimup
- Location: 272 km (169 mi) from Perth; 19 km (12 mi) from Manjimup

Government
  - State electorate: Warren-Blackwood
  - Federal division: O'Connor

Area
  - Total: 95 km^{2} (37 sq mi)

Population
  - Total: 55 (SAL 2021)
- Postcode: 6258
Localities around Upper Warren
Middlesex	Dingup	Perup
Smith Brook	Upper Warren	Perup
Collins	Quinninup	Lake Muir

Upper Warren is a rural locality of the Shire of Manjimup in the South West region of Western Australia. Its northern and eastern borders are formed by the Muir Highway, while it borders the South Western Highway at its far south-western corner. The Warren River runs from through the locality from east to west while, in places, also forming its border.

== History ==
Upper Warren is located on the traditional land of the Bibulman people of the Noongar nation.

The heritage listed Young's Homestead, Clover Cottage, Riverdale House and Upper Warren Tennis Club are located within Upper Warren, all on the shire's heritage list. The St Mark's Anglican Church and the Rockbridge hut are also in Upper Warren and are on the Western Australian State Register of Heritage Places.

Rockbridge is a two-roomed timber slab and shingled hut built in 1870 by John Mottram. The Mottram family lived in the hut until the 1920s, when it moved to a new, larger house nearby and the hut was used as workers accommodation. By 1980, the hut was in a ruinous state but it was restored by the family. St Mark's Anglican Church dates from 1891, to serve both as a school and church for four local families, the Blechyndens, Clarkes, Mottrams and Wheatleys. It served as a school until the 1920s and a church until the 1980s. The Clover Cottage was built by the Wheatleys in 1875, Riverdale House by the Mottrams in 1895, just like Rockbridge, and Young's Homestead by the Clarkes in 1880.

The Upper Warren Tennis Club was built as the Upper Warren School in 1924, and served as such until 1942. It became a community hall after that. The date of the construction of the tennis courts, was from accounts in 1927. However, there is also a claim of establishment in the 1940s.
