= Smith Brook, Western Australia =

Locality in the Shire of Manjimup, Western Australia

Smith Brook
- Interactive map of Smith Brook
- Coordinates: 34.37551°S 116.20393°E
- Country: Australia
- State: Western Australia
- LGA: Shire of Manjimup
- Location: 270 km (170 mi) from Perth; 15 km (9.3 mi) from Manjimup

Government
  - State electorate: Warren-Blackwood
  - Federal division: O'Connor

Area
  - Total: 34.8 km^{2} (13.4 sq mi)

Population
  - Total: 59 (SAL 2021)
- Postcode: 6258
Localities around Smith Brook
Diamond Tree	Middlesex	Middlesex
Collins	Smith Brook	Upper Warren
Collins	Collins	Upper Warren

Smith Brook is a rural locality of the Shire of Manjimup in the South West region of Western Australia. The South Western Highway forms the western border of the locality, with sections of the Sir James Mitchell National Park located either side along the highway. The Smith Brook, a small river, runs through the locality from north-west to south-east and enters the Warren River at its south-eastern boundary, which the latter forms. The Smith Brook Nature Reserve is also located within the north-west of the locality.

The locality of Smith Brook is located on the traditional land of the Bibulman people of the Noongar nation.
