= Beedelup, Western Australia =

Locality in the Shire of Manjimup, Western Australia

Beedelup
- other
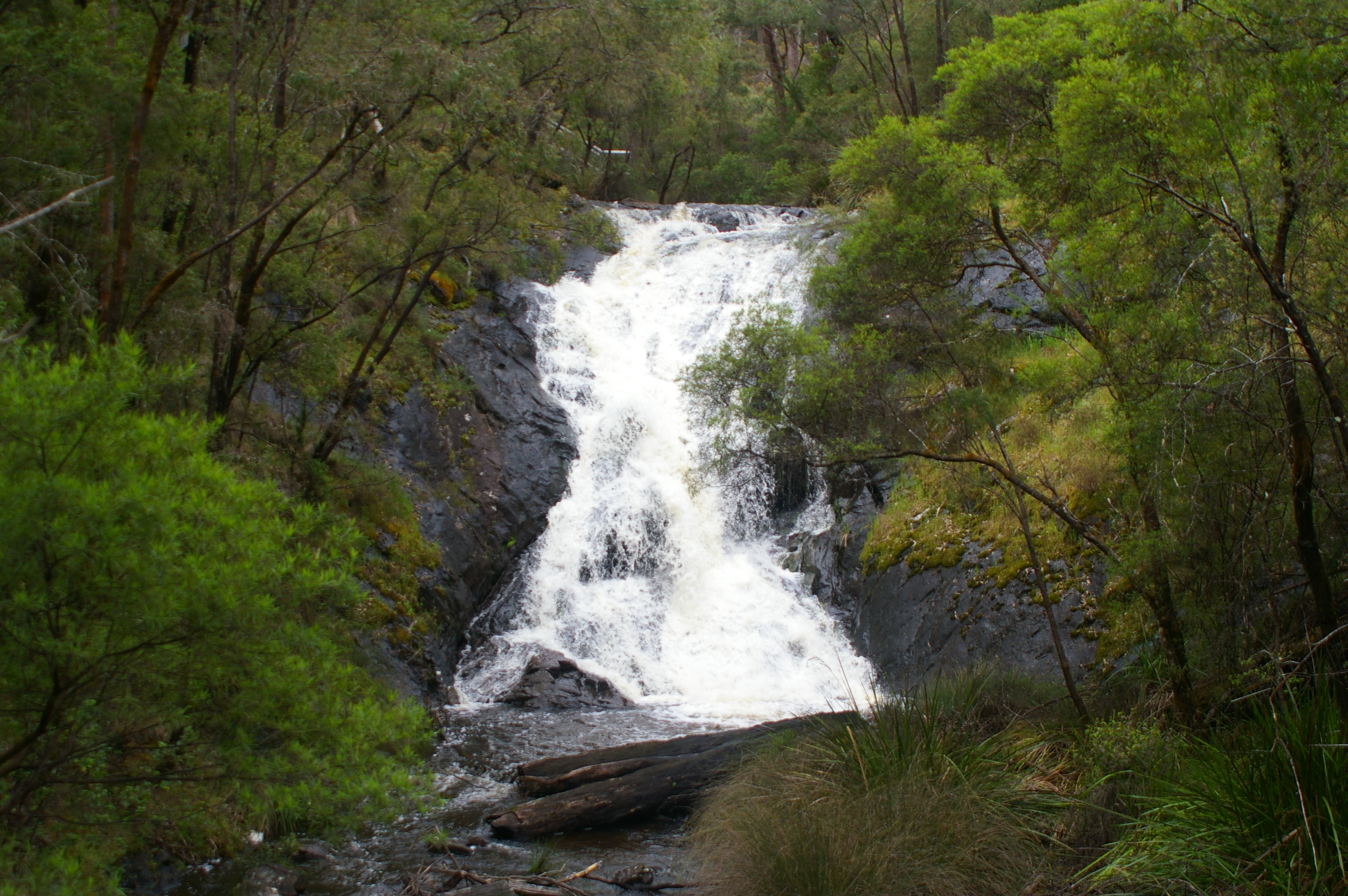
- Beedelup Falls

- Coordinates: 34.36769°S 115.87438°E
- Country: Australia
- State: Western Australia
- LGA: Shire of Manjimup
- Location: 275 km (171 mi) from Perth; 32 km (20 mi) from Manjimup; 16 km (9.9 mi) from Pemberton

Government
  - State electorate: Warren-Blackwood
  - Federal division: O'Connor

Area
  - Total: 160.7 km^{2} (62.0 sq mi)

Population
  - Total: 58 (SAL 2021)
- Postcode: 6260
Localities around Beedelup
Peerabeelup	Glenoran	Glenoran
Peerabeelup	Beedelup	Jardee
Yeagarup	Channybearup	Channybearup

Beedelup is a predominantly forested rural locality of the Shire of Manjimup in the South West region of Western Australia. The Vasse Highway forms the western and south-western border of the locality. Most of the Greater Beedelup National Park is located within Beedelup.

Beedelup is located on the traditional land of the Bibulman people of the Noongar nation.

The heritage listed Beedelup Falls are located within Beedelup and the Greater Beedelup National Park.
