= Perup, Western Australia =

Locality in the Shire of Manjimup, Western Australia

Perup
- other
- Coordinates: 34.31971°S 116.41079°E
- Country: Australia
- State: Western Australia
- LGA: Shire of Manjimup
- Location: 263 km (163 mi) from Perth; 24 km (15 mi) from Manjimup

Government
  - State electorate: Warren-Blackwood
  - Federal division: O'Connor

Area
  - Total: 456.5 km^{2} (176.3 sq mi)

Population
  - Total: 161 (SAL 2021)
- Postcode: 6258
Localities around Perup
| Balbarrup | Kingston | Tonebridge |
| Dingup | Perup | Mordalup |
| Upper Warren | Lake Muir | Lake Muir |

Perup is a rural locality of the Shire of Manjimup in the South West region of Western Australia. The Muir Highway forms the southern border of the locality while the Perup River runs through Perup from north to south. The south-eastern corner of Greater Kingston National Park sticks into the north of the locality.

Perup is located on the traditional land of the Bibulman people of the Noongar nation.

The heritage listed Perup Homestead, listed on the shire's heritage list and on the now defunct Register of the National Estate, is located within Perup, having been constructed in 1885. It is at the site of a shepherd's hut build by the Muir family in 1855, early European settlers in the area.

In the 1940s Perup-reared cattle were considered as high value.

The south-western part of the Tone-Perup Nature Reserve is located within Perup. The nature reserve is one of two locations home to numbats, the other one being Dryandra Woodland National Park.
