= Vasse Highway =

Highway in the South West region of Western Australia

Vasse Highway Western Australia
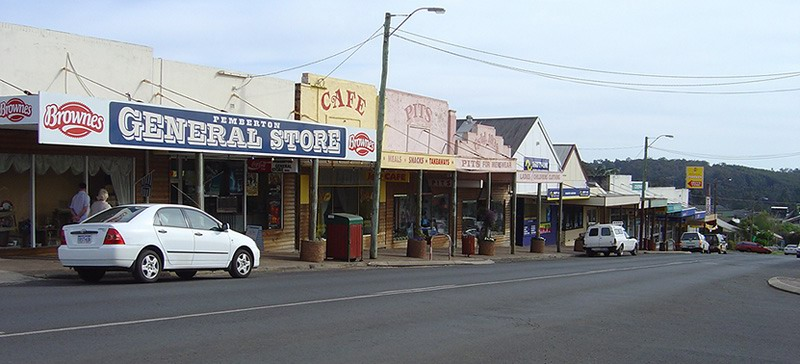
- Vasse Highway in Pemberton

General information
- Type: Highway
- Length: 151 km (94 mi)
- Route number(s): State Route 104 (Busselton – Nannup); State Route 10 (Nannup – Pemberton)

Major junctions
- Northwest end: Bussell Highway (State Route 10), Busselton
- Brockman Highway (State Route 10); Pemberton–Northcliffe Road (State Route 10)
- Southeast end: South Western Highway (National Route 1) near Manjimup

Location(s)
- Major settlements: Nannup, Pemberton

Highway system
- Highways in Australia; National Highway • Freeways in Australia; Highways in Western Australia

Vasse Highway is a Western Australian highway connecting Busselton and the South Western Highway 15 kilometres (9.3 mi) south of Manjimup. It is 151 kilometres (94 mi) long and travels through jarrah and karri hardwood forests for most of its length, with some small agricultural areas and wineries nearby, and forms the main street of the towns of Nannup (as Warren Road) and Pemberton (as Brockman Street).

From Busselton, it starts as State Route 104 from the Bussell Highway 3 km east of Busselton, near the Sir Stuart Bovell sporting complex, and travels the 56 km to Nannup, where it intersects with the Brockman Highway and becomes State Route 10. It then passes Donnelly River and Karri Valley Resort, and 22 km west of Pemberton turnoffs provide entrances to the Beedelup National Park.

About 4 km before Pemberton, the highway ends at a T junction. A left turn continues unsigned as Vasse Highway into the town of Pemberton, then for another 19 km until ending at South Western Highway near Diamond Tree 15 km south of Manjimup. A right turn continues southwards as State Route 10 to Northcliffe, allowing access to the Warren National Park. Route 10 then heads east along Middleton Road, meeting with the South Western Highway near the Shannon mill.

== Cities and towns ==
- Busselton
- Yoongarillup
- Nannup
- Donnelly River
- Pemberton

== Intersections ==
LGA	Location	km	mi	Destinations	Notes
Busselton	Yalyalup-Bovell-Reinscourt tripoint	0	0.0	Bussell Highway (State Route 104) – Busselton, Augusta, Capel, Bunbury	Northern terminus. State Route 104 northern terminus
Busselton	Yalyalup-Bovell boundary	4.0	2.5	Neville Hyder Drive	Access to Busselton Margaret River Airport
Busselton	Yoongarillup	8.0	5.0	Sues Road – Augusta, Capel, Bunbury	Staggered T-junctions favouring Sues Road
Blackwood River		57.1– 57.3	35.5– 35.6	Blackwood River bridge	
Nannup	Nannup	57.4	35.7	Grange Road – Southampton, Balingup	Access to Nannup Balingup Road (Tourist Drive 251)
Nannup	Nannup	58.1	36.1	Brockman Highway – Donnelly River, Bridgetown	Access to Tourist Drive 251
Nannup	Nannup	60.1	37.3	Brockman Highway (State Route 10) – Karridale, Augusta	Continuing traffic on Vasse Highway must turn. State Route 104 southern terminus. State Route 10 northern concurrency terminus
Manjimup	Channybearup-Collins-Yeagarup tripoint	132	82	Pemberton-Northcliffe Road (State Route 10; Tourist Route 259) – Northcliffe, Windy Harbour, Shannon	Continuing traffic on Vasse Highway must turn. State Route 10 and Tourist Route 259 southern concurrency termini.
Manjimup	Pemberton	135	84	Hepple Place northbound / Ellis Street southbound - Gloucester National Park	Access to Gloucester Tree
Manjimup	Pemberton	137	85	Pemberton North Road (Tourist Route 259) – Diamond Tree	Tourist Route 259 northern concurrency terminus
Manjimup	Diamond Tree–Middlesex boundary	151	94	South Western Highway (National Route 1) – Bunbury, Manjimup, Walpole, Albany	Eastern terminus at T-junction
1.000 mi = 1.609 km; 1.000 km = 0.621 mi: Concurrency terminus; Route transition; Note: Intersections with minor local roads are not shown

== See also ==
- Highways in Australia
- List of highways in Western Australia
