= Eastbrook, Western Australia =

Locality in the Shire of Manjimup, Western Australia

Eastbrook
- Town
- Coordinates: 34.40016°S 116.06922°E
- Country: Australia
- State: Western Australia
- LGA: Shire of Manjimup
- Location: 270 km (170 mi) from Perth; 17 km (11 mi) from Manjimup; 8 km (5.0 mi) from Pemberton

Government
  - State electorate: Warren-Blackwood
  - Federal division: O'Connor

Area
  - Total: 56.4 km^{2} (21.8 sq mi)

Population
  - Total: 140 (SAL 2021)
- Postcode: 6260
Localities around Eastbrook
Channybearup	Diamond Tree	Diamond Tree
Channybearup	Eastbrook	Collins
Channybearup	Pemberton	Collins

Eastbrook is a rural locality and town of the Shire of Manjimup, located near Pemberton, in the South West region of Western Australia. The Vasse Highway forms much of the eastern border of the locality.

Eastbrook is located on the traditional land of the Bibulman people of the Noongar nation.

The town of Eastbrook was established in 1922 as part of the Group Settlement Scheme and settled by former dockworkers. The townsite was gazetted in 1932.

The locality was once a stop on the Northcliffe branch railway, with a siding established in 1922.
