= Glenoran, Western Australia =

Locality in the Shire of Manjimup, Western Australia

Glenoran
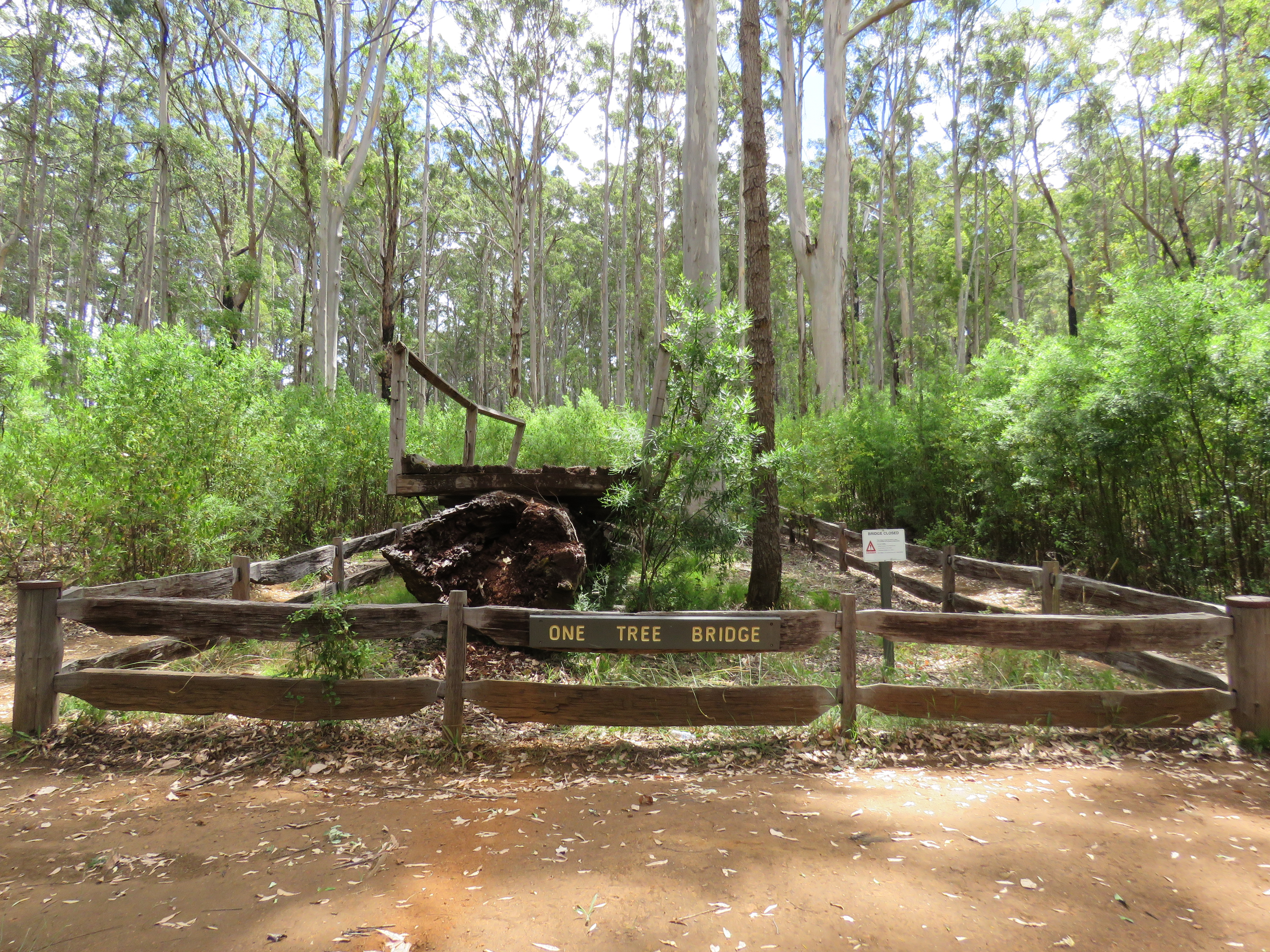
- One Tree Bridge over Donnelly River

- Interactive map of Glenoran
- Coordinates: 34.30498°S 115.90703°E
- Country: Australia
- State: Western Australia
- LGA: Shire of Manjimup
- Location: 251 km (156 mi) from Perth; 19 km (12 mi) from Manjimup

Government
  - State electorate: Warren-Blackwood
  - Federal division: O'Connor

Area
  - Total: 249.5 km^{2} (96.3 sq mi)

Population
  - Total: 97 (SAL 2021)
- Postcode: 6258
Localities around Glenoran
Carlotta	Donnelly River	Yanmah
Peerabeelup	Glenoran	Deanmill
Beedelup	Beedelup	Jardee

Glenoran is a rural locality of the Shire of Manjimup in the South West region of Western Australia. The Donnelly River runs through the locality from north to south, turning west shortly after entering the Greater Beedelup National Park, which covers the south-west of Glenoran.

== History ==
Glenoran is located on the traditional land of the Bibulman people of the Noongar nation.

The Glenoran Hall, a timber building, was constructed in the 1920s as part of the Group Settlement Scheme, but the hall was later moved to Yanmah. The former hall is now private property and has been significantly altered.

Glenoran is also home to Glenoran Pool, located on the Donnelly River, just south of One Tree Bridge. It was once the swimming and fishing spot for the Group Settlement. One Tree Bridge was built in 1904 by local settlers Herbert and Walter Giblett by felling a large karri tree and dropping it across the Donnelly River to form the base of the bridge. Prior to this, crossing the river was a hazardous experience, requiring fording the river at a rocky crossing. The bridge eventually disintegrated and fell into the river but some parts of it have been salvaged and placed on display at location. Both the Munda Biddi Trail and the Bibbulmun Track pass through the area of the bridge, which is proposed as a future conservation park.
