= List of lakes of Powell County, Montana =

There are at least 68 named lakes and reservoirs in Powell County, Montana.

== Lakes ==
- Bear Lake, 47°06′01″N 112°56′08″W, el. 4,862 feet (1,482 m)
- Beaver Pond, 46°38′30″N 112°31′40″W, el. 5,115 feet (1,559 m)
- Beaver Pond, 46°42′23″N 112°35′23″W, el. 5,597 feet (1,706 m)
- Big Knife Lakes, 47°29′19″N 113°26′13″W, el. 7,323 feet (2,232 m)
- Braziel Lake, 46°47′20″N 112°49′46″W, el. 5,157 feet (1,572 m)
- Browns Lake, 46°57′24″N 113°00′33″W, el. 4,298 feet (1,310 m)
- Caruthers Lake, 46°20′00″N 113°00′38″W, el. 8,097 feet (2,468 m)
- Chimney Lakes, 46°45′14″N 113°00′56″W, el. 5,335 feet (1,626 m)
- Coopers Lake, 47°04′50″N 112°55′04″W, el. 4,495 feet (1,370 m)
- Crimson Lake, 47°18′01″N 113°20′32″W, el. 6,581 feet (2,006 m)
- Deadmans Lake, 46°59′22″N 112°57′54″W, el. 4,377 feet (1,334 m)
- Dolus Lakes, 46°25′06″N 112°59′52″W, el. 7,510 feet (2,290 m)
- Doney Lake, 47°02′44″N 113°01′49″W, el. 4,465 feet (1,361 m)
- Elbow Lake, 46°21′53″N 113°01′31″W, el. 7,746 feet (2,361 m)
- Evans Lake, 47°00′15″N 113°04′19″W, el. 4,193 feet (1,278 m)
- Hagan Pond, 46°28′46″N 112°52′55″W, el. 5,000 feet (1,500 m)
- James Lake, 47°04′32″N 113°12′43″W, el. 4,137 feet (1,261 m)
- Jones Lake, 47°02′35″N 113°08′35″W, el. 4,088 feet (1,246 m)
- Kleinschmidt Lake, 46°58′33″N 113°02′35″W, el. 4,186 feet (1,276 m)
- Lahrity Lake, 47°01′28″N 113°11′01″W, el. 4,157 feet (1,267 m)
- Lake Otatsy, 47°10′36″N 113°01′43″W, el. 6,069 feet (1,850 m)
- Lena Lake, 47°27′58″N 113°28′01″W, el. 6,735 feet (2,053 m)
- Lilly Lake, 46°32′39″N 112°26′33″W, el. 5,433 feet (1,656 m)
- Little Goat Lake, 46°20′20″N 113°00′55″W, el. 8,238 feet (2,511 m)
- Moose Lake, 46°25′26″N 112°55′42″W, el. 5,997 feet (1,828 m)
- Morrell Lake, 47°17′52″N 113°27′53″W, el. 4,829 feet (1,472 m)
- Mud Lake, 47°04′34″N 113°11′34″W, el. 4,081 feet (1,244 m)
- Nolo Lake, 47°04′19″N 112°51′03″W, el. 6,496 feet (1,980 m)
- Otis Lake, 47°19′28″N 113°23′46″W, el. 7,136 feet (2,175 m)
- Perkins Pond, 46°19′07″N 112°52′44″W, el. 5,351 feet (1,631 m)
- Powell Lake, 46°21′46″N 112°53′34″W, el. 6,381 feet (1,945 m)
- Prisoner Lake, 47°32′07″N 113°10′19″W, el. 7,067 feet (2,154 m)
- Pyramid Lake, 47°16′01″N 113°22′55″W, el. 6,945 feet (2,117 m)
- Reservoir Lake, 47°01′44″N 112°48′38″W, el. 5,482 feet (1,671 m)
- Rice Lake, 47°05′34″N 113°10′45″W, el. 4,117 feet (1,255 m)
- Ryan Lake, 46°18′47″N 112°59′10″W, el. 7,897 feet (2,407 m)
- Shoup Lake, 47°05′51″N 113°10′43″W, el. 4,137 feet (1,261 m)
- Slate Lake, 46°30′13″N 112°27′17″W, el. 6,007 feet (1,831 m)
- Spawn Lake, 47°03′50″N 112°55′36″W, el. 4,423 feet (1,348 m)
- Trask Lakes, 46°21′20″N 113°01′31″W, el. 7,730 feet (2,360 m)
- Tupper Lake, 47°01′08″N 112°54′36″W, el. 4,636 feet (1,413 m)
- Upper Elliot Lake, 46°20′31″N 112°59′31″W, el. 8,182 feet (2,494 m)
- Upsata Lake, 47°04′41″N 113°13′19″W, el. 4,137 feet (1,261 m)

== Reservoirs ==
- Bandy Reservoir, 47°04′48″N 113°14′20″W, el. 4,213 feet (1,284 m)
- Bohn Lake, 46°18′53″N 112°57′37″W, el. 7,123 feet (2,171 m)
- Bowman Lakes, 46°18′45″N 113°01′21″W, el. 7,854 feet (2,394 m)
- Caruthers Lake, 46°20′00″N 113°05′03″W, el. 7,890 feet (2,400 m)
- Conleys Lake, 46°23′12″N 112°51′02″W, el. 5,233 feet (1,595 m)
- Doney Lake, 46°26′52″N 112°57′17″W, el. 6,270 feet (1,910 m)
- Goat Lake, 46°19′53″N 113°01′05″W, el. 8,222 feet (2,506 m)
- Kerns Lake, 46°24′03″N 112°50′40″W, el. 5,069 feet (1,545 m)
- Lois Lake, 46°39′03″N 112°28′59″W, el. 5,207 feet (1,587 m)
- Lower Bowman Lake, 46°18′48″N 113°01′27″W, el. 7,854 feet (2,394 m)
- Lower Elliot Lake, 46°20′14″N 112°59′53″W, el. 7,930 feet (2,420 m)
- Lower Taylor Reservoir, 46°24′28″N 112°49′36″W, el. 5,003 feet (1,525 m)
- Lynn Reservoir, 47°05′38″N 113°14′36″W, el. 4,272 feet (1,302 m)
- Martin Lake, 46°21′13″N 112°59′42″W, el. 8,632 feet (2,631 m)
- Middle Bowman Lake, 46°19′00″N 113°01′39″W, el. 7,999 feet (2,438 m)
- Miller Lake, 46°40′27″N 112°57′52″W, el. 4,705 feet (1,434 m)
- Mountain Ben Lake, 46°20′04″N 113°01′37″W, el. 8,553 feet (2,607 m)
- Mud Lake, 46°23′12″N 112°50′34″W, el. 5,115 feet (1,559 m)
- Nevada Lake, 46°48′11″N 112°48′37″W, el. 4,606 feet (1,404 m)
- Powell Reservoirs, 46°21′13″N 112°51′11″W, el. 5,285 feet (1,611 m)
- Rock Creek Lake, 46°25′41″N 112°56′23″W, el. 5,830 feet (1,780 m)
- Tin Cup Lake, 46°23′18″N 112°51′21″W, el. 5,256 feet (1,602 m)
- Upper Bowman Lake, 46°18′54″N 113°01′33″W, el. 7,976 feet (2,431 m)
- Upper Taylor Reservoir, 46°24′32″N 112°50′11″W, el. 5,092 feet (1,552 m)
- Wales Creek Reservoir, 46°54′42″N 113°08′15″W, el. 4,488 feet (1,368 m)

== See also ==
- List of lakes in Montana
