= Middlesex, Western Australia =

Locality in the Shire of Manjimup, Western Australia

Middlesex
- other
- Coordinates: 34.30326°S 116.17890°E
- Country: Australia
- State: Western Australia
- LGA: Shire of Manjimup
- Location: 265 km (165 mi) from Perth; 9 km (5.6 mi) from Manjimup; 18 km (11 mi) from Pemberton

Government
  - State electorate: Warren-Blackwood
  - Federal division: O'Connor

Area
  - Total: 82.7 km^{2} (31.9 sq mi)

Population
  - Total: 232 (SAL 2021)
- Postcode: 6258
Localities around Middlesex
Manjimup	Manjimup	Dingup
Jardee	Middlesex	Dingup
Diamond Tree	Smith Brook	Upper Warren

Middlesex is a rural locality of the Shire of Manjimup in the South West region of Western Australia. The locality's western border is formed by the South Western Highway while the Muir Highway forms its eastern border. A small section of the Sir James Mitchell National Park is also located within Middlesex.

Middlesex is located on the traditional land of the Bibulman people of the Noongar nation.

The locality is also home to three heritage listed sites: the Middlesex Hall, the former school house and the former Group Settler's Cottage.
