= Quinninup, Western Australia =

Locality in the Shire of Manjimup, Western Australia

Quinninup
- Interactive map of Quinninup
- Coordinates: 34.40977°S 116.32616°E
- Country: Australia
- State: Western Australia
- LGA: Shire of Manjimup
- Location: 278 km (173 mi) from Perth; 24 km (15 mi) from Manjimup

Government
  - State electorate: Warren-Blackwood
  - Federal division: O'Connor

Area
  - Total: 217.9 km^{2} (84.1 sq mi)

Population
  - Total: 172 (SAL 2021)
- Postcode: 6258
Localities around Quinninup
Collins	Upper Warren	Upper Warren
Crowea	Quinninup	Lake Muir
Crowea	Crowea	Lake Muir

Quinninup is a rural locality of the Shire of Manjimup in the South West region of Western Australia. The South Western Highway forms much of its eastern border, as does the Warren River to the north. The eastern parts of Greater Dordagup National Park are located within Quinninup.

== History ==
Quinninup is located on the traditional land of the Bibulman people of the Noongar nation.

The heritage listed Quinninup Mill Cottages, Quinninup School and Quinninup Tavern are located within Quinninup, as well as a heritage listed Cork Tree, all on the shire's heritage list. The St Erney's Homestead is on the Western Australian State Register of Heritage Places.

The St Erney's Homestead dates to the early 1900s and is a rammed earth building with jarrah floors and ceilings. A second building, an abandoned former Group Settlement timber cottage from Northcliffe, was added in 1945 by being relocated there. The homestead was built for Thomas Harris Parsons, his wife and three sons and was named after the St Erney church in Landrake, Cornwall, where his wife had been christened. Thomas Harris Parsons died in 1917 and his wife, Edith Jane Parsons, in 1937 but the homestead remained in possession of the Parsons family until 1979.

Quinninup itself was established in 1924 as part of the Group Settlement Scheme, with 17 families initially settling there, a number that grew to 40 at its peak. Almost from the start, Quinninup had a school, which remained open until 2004. A second wave of settlers came to Quinninup in 1944, to work in the local timber mill, operated by Millars. The mill burned down in 1962 but was rebuilt and operated for another 20 years, until closed in 1982. In 1986, the complete settlement was sold to a developer, who divided it up into single properties.

With the establishment of the mill, a 26-kilometre (16 mi) long timber railway connecting to the Northcliffe branch railway at Jardee was constructed under difficult circumstances because of the war and completed in 1944.
