= Collins, Western Australia =

Locality in the Shire of Manjimup, Western Australia

Collins
- other
- Coordinates: 34.43394°S 116.12391°E
- Country: Australia
- State: Western Australia
- LGA: Shire of Manjimup
- Location: 281 km (175 mi) from Perth; 28 km (17 mi) from Manjimup; 5 km (3.1 mi) from Pemberton

Government
  - State electorate: Warren-Blackwood
  - Federal division: O'Connor

Area
  - Total: 133.8 km^{2} (51.7 sq mi)

Population
  - Total: 49 (SAL 2021)
- Postcode: 6260
Localities around Collins
Pemberton	Eastbrook	Smith Brook
Yeagarup	Collins	Quinninup
Crowea	Crowea	Crowea

Collins is a rural locality of the Shire of Manjimup in the South West region of Western Australia. The South Western Highway forms the north-eastern border of the locality while the Vasse Highway runs along its north-western one. The Warren River forms the entire eastern and southern border of Collins. Small sections of the Sir James Mitchell and Gloucester National Park are also located within the locality.

== History ==
Collins is located on the traditional land of the Bibulman people of the Noongar nation.

The locality was once a stop on the Northcliffe branch railway. The Warren River railway bridge, located on the border of Collins and Crowea but listed under Collins, of the Northcliffe Branch railway is now on the Western Australian State Register of Heritage Places. After closure of the line, the bridge was the stopping place for the shorter run of the Pemberton-Northcliffe Railway from Pemberton, a heritage railway. The heritage assessment for the bridge deemed it to be the most impressive bridge on the line, being 127 metres long, 10 metres high and constructed in 1930. The Warren River was repaired in 1961, after suffering fire damage and, again, from 1972 to 1973.

A second railway bridge over the Warren River was subsequently used as a road bridge, is on the shire's heritage list, and is now used as crossing on the Bibbulmun Track. Also on the shire's heritage list is Warren House, which was built by convicts for Edward Revely Brockman in 1865, an early European settler in the area who married into the Bussell family. Brockman became the first chairman of the Lower Blackwood Road District, now the Shire of Nannup and has a street in Pemberton named after him.
