= East Brook =

East Brook may refer to:

- East Brook (Read Creek), New York, U.S.
- East Brook (West Branch Delaware River tributary), New York, U.S.

== See also ==
- Eastbrook (disambiguation)
