= Fontanini =

Fontanini is an Italian surname. Notable people with the surname include:

- Archie Fontanini (1880–1982), Italian-Australian pioneer
- Estefania Fontanini (born 1988), Argentine sprint canoer
- Fabricio Fontanini (born 1990), Argentine footballer
- Giusto Fontanini (1666–1736), Italian historian and Roman Catholic archbishop
- Pietro Fontanini (born 1952), Italian politician

== See also ==
- Nativity scene
