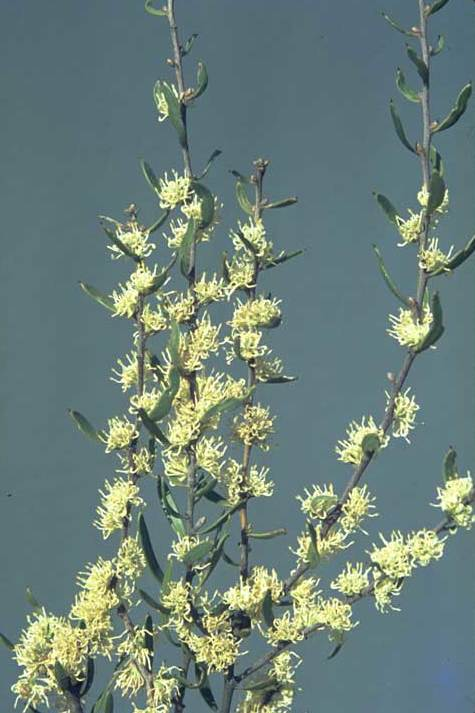

Scientific classification
- Kingdom: Plantae
- Clade: Tracheophytes
- Clade: Angiosperms
- Clade: Eudicots
- Order: Proteales
- Family: Proteaceae
- Genus: Hakea
- Species: H. falcata

Binomial name
- Hakea falcata R.Br.
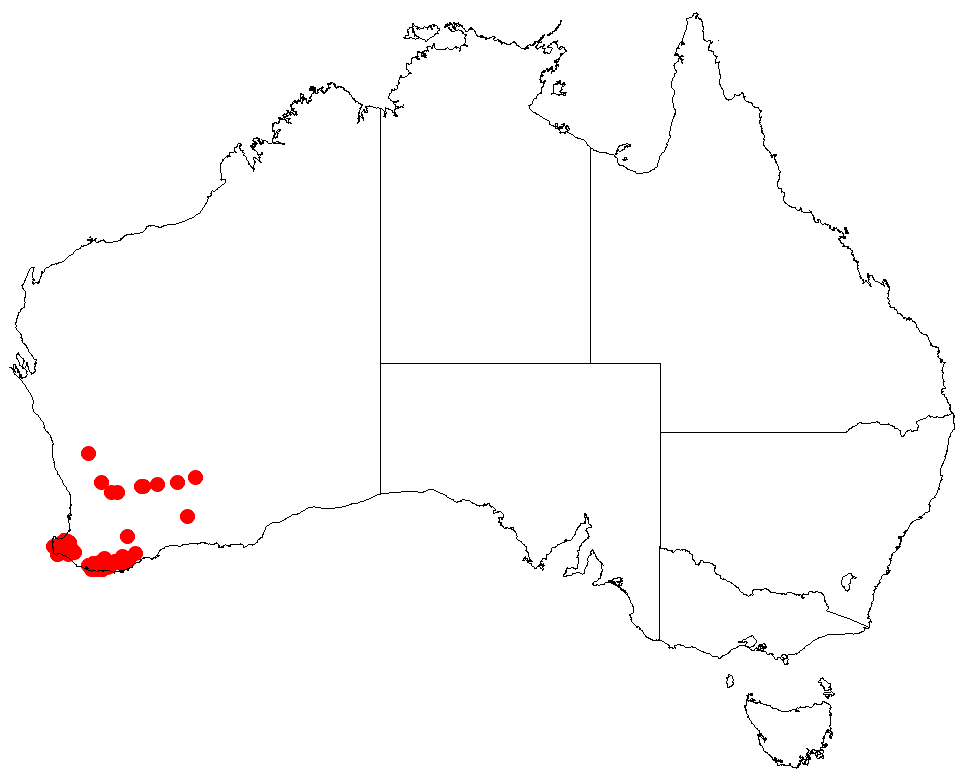
- Occurrence data from AVH

= Hakea falcata =

Sickle hakea

Species of shrub endemic to Western Australia

Hakea falcata, commonly known as sickle hakea, is a shrub in the family Proteaceae and is endemic to southern Western Australia. It has narrow egg-shaped leaves, cream flowers and blooms in spring.

== Description ==
The erect loose non-lignotuberous shrub typically grows to a height of 2 to 4 metres (6.6 to 13.1 ft). The branchlets have a patchy covering of pale rusty-brown coloured hairs. The flat curved evergreen leaves have a linear to narrowly obovate shape with a length of 5 to 14 centimetres (2.0 to 5.5 in) and a width of 3 to 14 millimetres (0.118 to 0.551 in) and have three or rarely four longitudinal veins. It blooms from September to November and produces white-yellow or white-pink flowers. Each solitary inflorescence contains 25 to 40 flowers with a creamy coloured perianth and a cream pistil with a length of 4.5 to 6.5 mm (0.177 to 0.256 in). After flowering, an obliquely narrowly ovate, curved and prominently beaked fruit is produced which is 2 to 2.5 cm (0.8 to 1.0 in) in length and 7 to 10 mm (0.276 to 0.394 in) wide. The fruit contain narrowly ovate shaped blackish brown seeds with a wing down one side.

== Taxonomy and naming ==
The species was first formally described by the botanist Robert Brown in 1830 as part of the work Supplementum primum prodromi florae Novae Hollandiae. The only synonym is Hakea falcata var. falcata as described by Carl Meissner. The specific epithet is taken from the Latin word falcatus meaning 'curved like a sickle', referring to the shape of the leaves.

== Distribution ==
It is endemic to an area along the coast in the South West and Great Southern regions of Western Australia between around Busselton and Albany and with a small population isolated in the Stirling Range around Cranbrook. It is found in winter wet depressions and other damp areas growing in peaty-sandy or sandy-clay soils. The shrub is often part of the understorey in jarrah forest or open Eucalypt woodland communities.

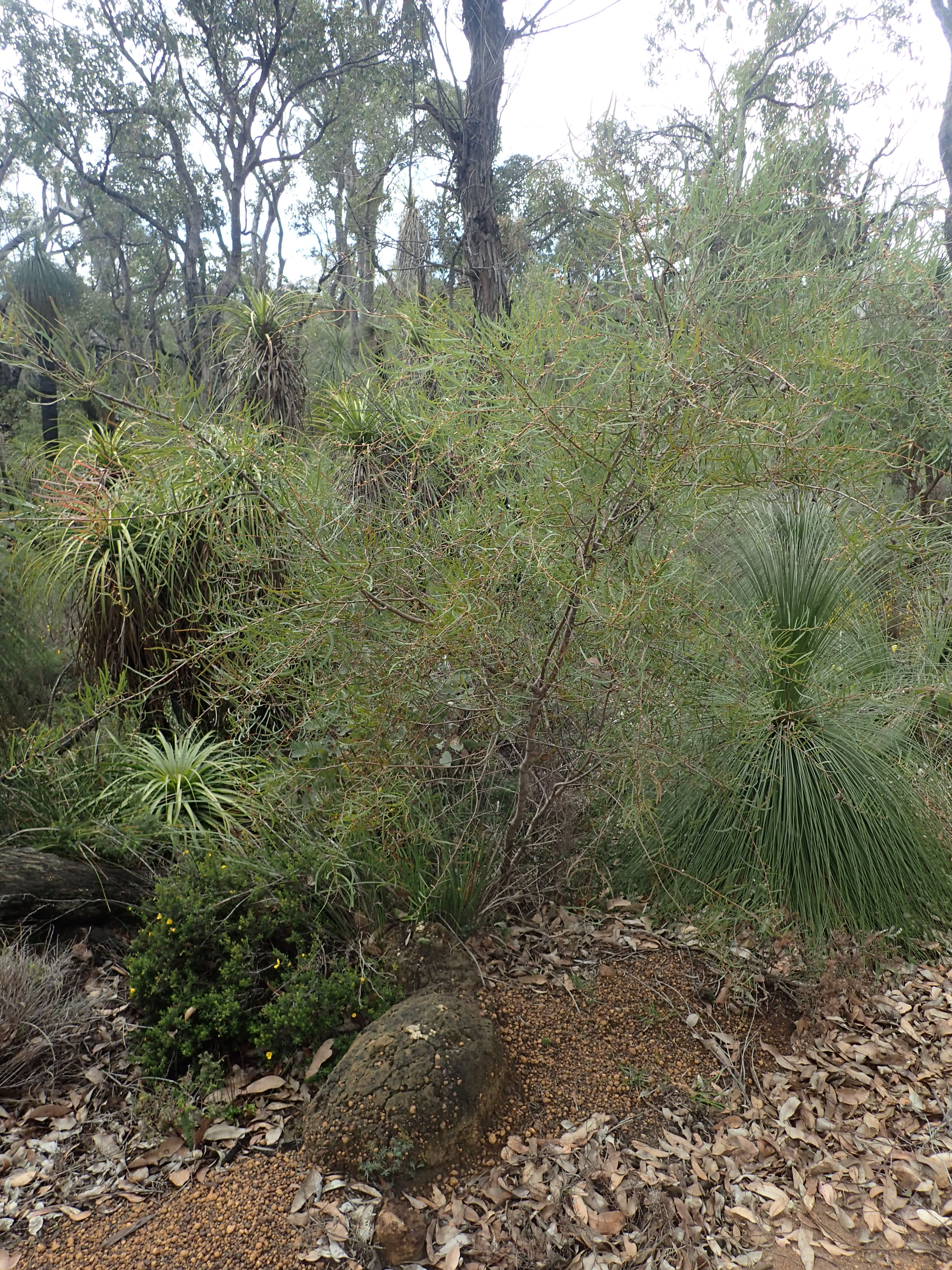
Habit near the Vasse Highway south-east of Busselton

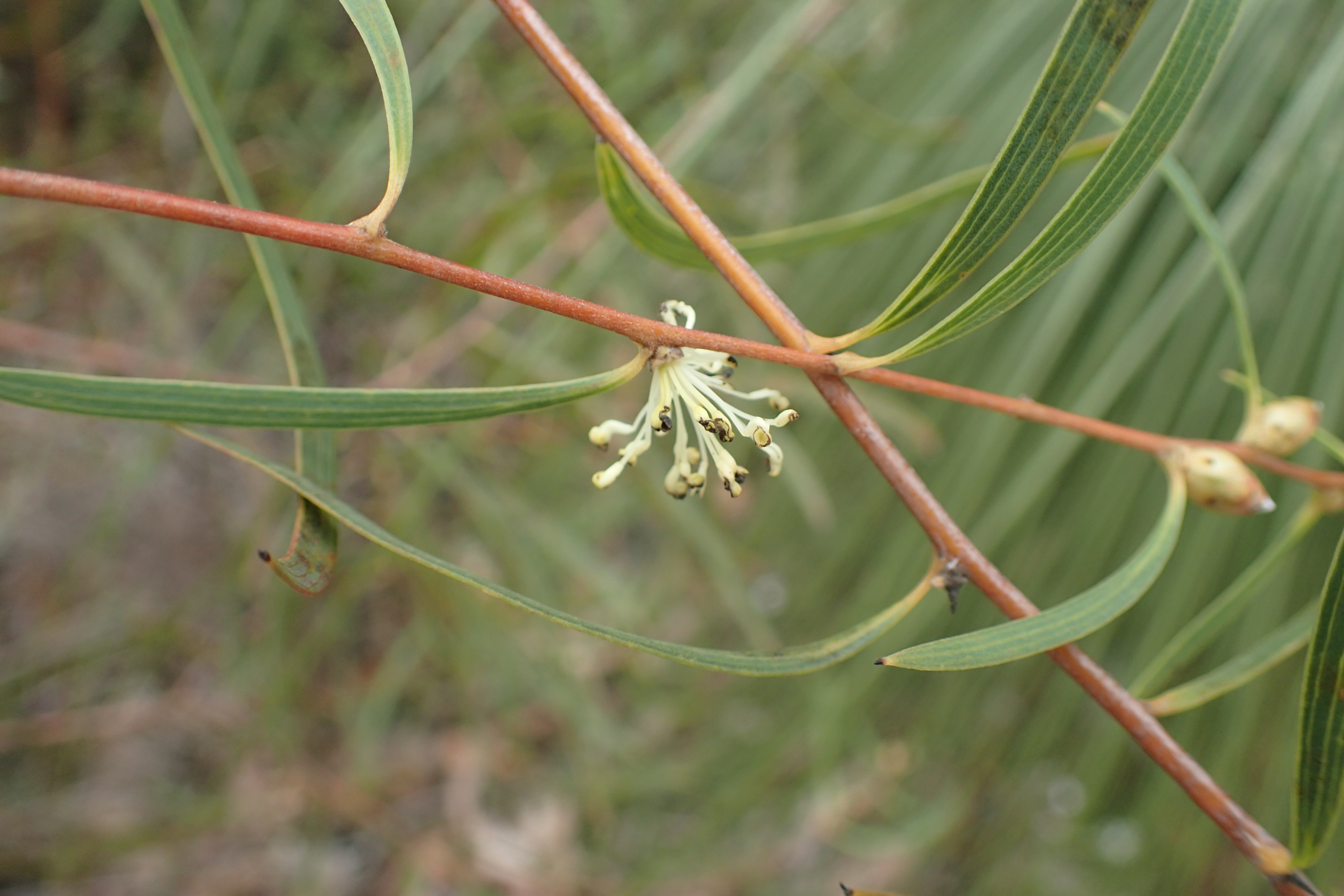
Flowers

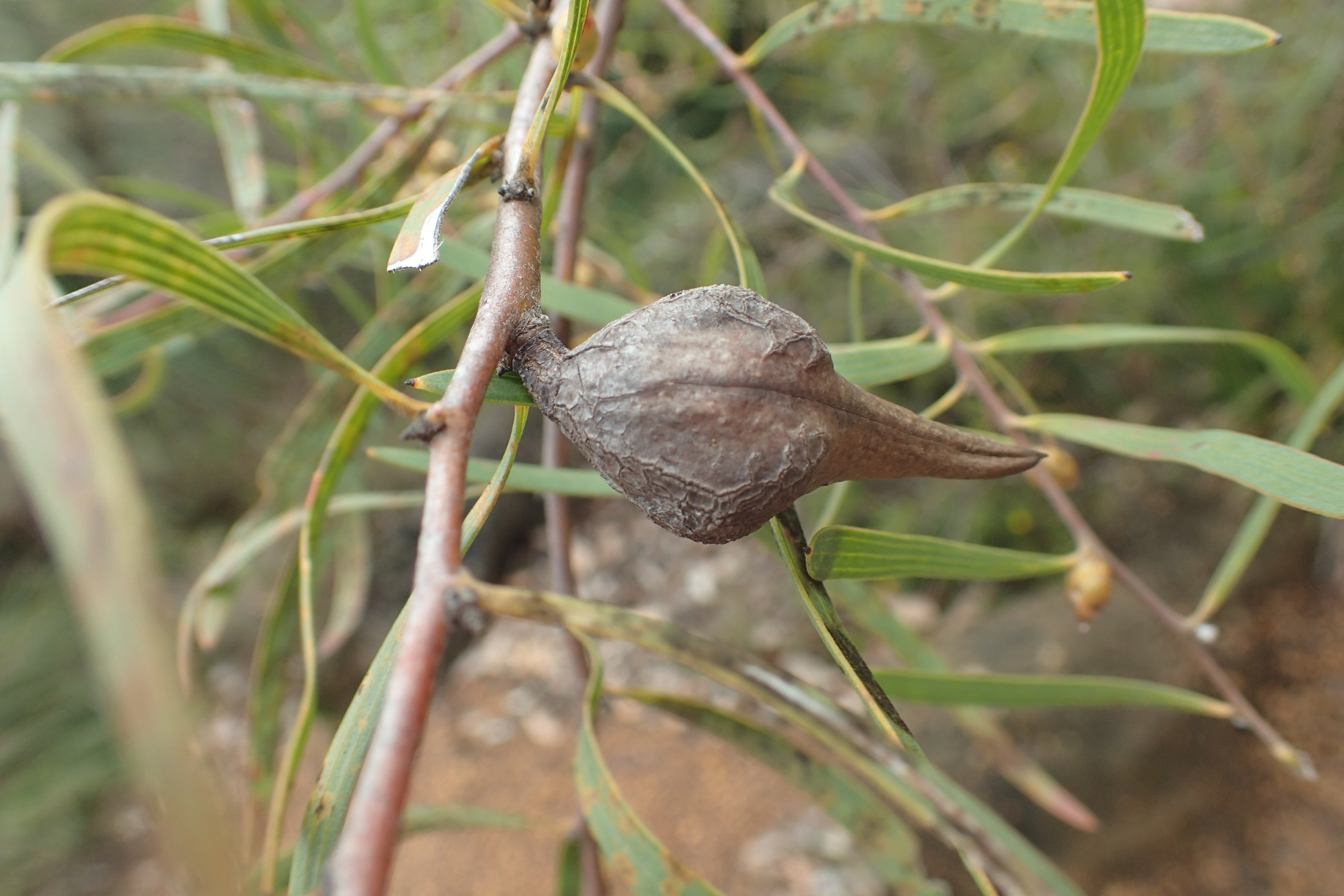
Fruit

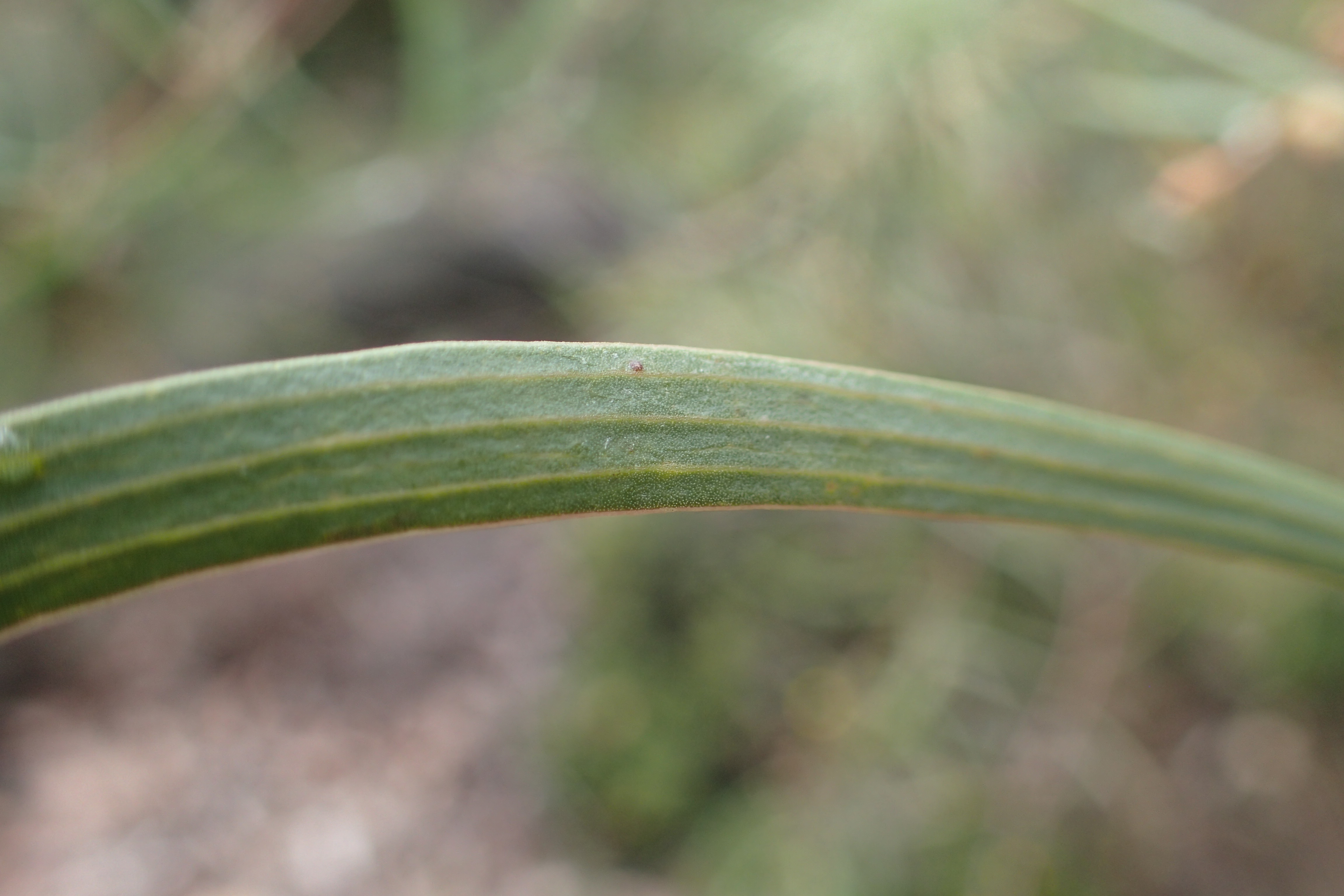
Leaf detail
