= Channybearup, Western Australia =

Locality in the Shire of Manjimup, Western Australia

Channybearup
- other
- Coordinates: 34.40890°S 115.94576°E
- Country: Australia
- State: Western Australia
- LGA: Shire of Manjimup
- Location: 272 km (169 mi) from Perth; 24 km (15 mi) from Manjimup; 8 km (5.0 mi) from Pemberton

Government
  - State electorate: Warren-Blackwood
  - Federal division: O'Connor

Area
  - Total: 116.3 km^{2} (44.9 sq mi)

Population
  - Total: 122 (SAL 2021)
- Postcode: 6260
Localities around Channybearup
Beedelup	Jardee	Eastbrook
Beedelup	Channybearup	Pemberton
Yeagarup	Yeagarup	Collins

Channybearup is a rural locality of the Shire of Manjimup in the South West region of Western Australia. The locality is predominantly covered by state forest but a small section of the Greater Beedelup National Park also stretches into the north-west of Channybearup.

Channybearup is located on the traditional land of the Bibulman people of the Noongar nation.

The heritage listed Pimelia Forestry Settlement is located within Channybearup.
