= Fonty's Pool =

Swimming pool near Manjimup, Western Australia

Coordinates: 34.289125°S 116.065528°E

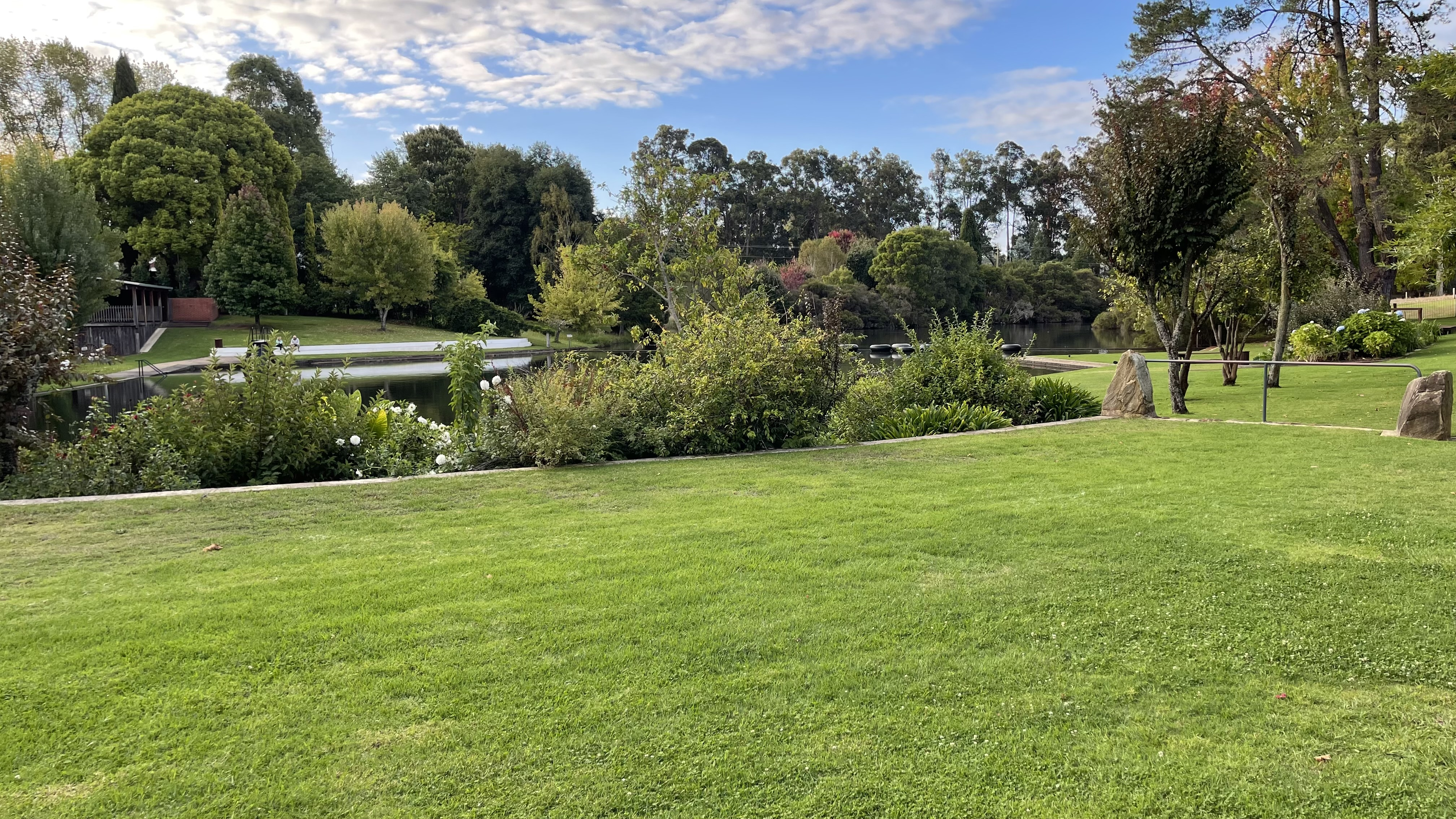
Pool and gardens in 2026

Fonty's Pool is a historic freshwater swimming pool near Manjimup, Western Australia. It is registered with the National Trust of Australia as an area of heritage significance.

== History ==
=== Creation of the pool ===
Archimede "Archie" Fontanini arrived with 12 shillings and 6 pence, equivalent to A$110.89 in 2022, in Fremantle, Western Australia from Italy in 1904. He worked for a timber sawmill at Greenbushes for three years, then decided to move near Bridgetown to become a farmer. Fontanini bought 190 hectares (460 acres) of land in what was known locally as Archie's Oven Gulley in 1907. He cleared the land and planted and harvested apples and various vegetables. The water in the front of the house was used to grow heavy crops, and Fontanini decided to rest the land by damming the stream with a large log and earth. He believed this would settle the silt in the water and improve the land's fertility.

Fontanini and his wife had five children, who swam regularly in the dam he created. The dam became popular with other children and adults as the district of Manjimup and timber town of Deanmill expanded. There was no public pool in Manjimup, and Fontanini was encouraged to keep the dam and charge an entry fee. This he did, and he constructed facilities, cemented the dam walls and floor and developed the surrounding gardens with little mechanical assistance.

=== Open to the public ===
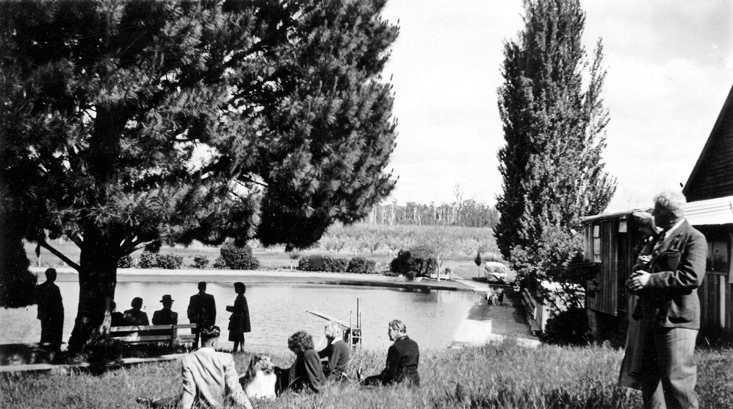
Fonty's Pool in 1950

The pool was officially opened to the public in 1925. On Australia Day, 1947, a log chop was held as part of an Australia Day Sports carnival. This was held annually for eleven years.

In 1950, Fontanini retired from farming to work full-time on managing the pool and gardens. Fonty's Pool received thousands of visitors each year, and the swimming lessons were very popular. Fontanini was made a Member of the Order of the British Empire and received a Queen's honour for his contribution to the community and tourist industry in 1970.

Fontanini closed the pool to the public in 1973, because the management burden was too great. Community support saw the pool reopened in 1979 with the Australia Day Log Chops and Swimming Carnival, in celebration of Western Australia's 150th anniversary. Some 12,000 people attended the carnival. Fontanini was present at the celebration. He died in 1982.

== Today ==
Public liability insurance issues led to the closure of Fonty's Pool in 2005, when its insurance policy was revoked. The Fontanini family sold the farm shortly afterwards. The new owners, with assistance from the National Trust of Australia, reopened the pool with a 300-metre (980 ft) fence around the perimeter to meet insurance requirements.

The Shire of Manjimup celebrated its centenary on Australia Day 2008 with a "Back to Fonty's" event. The celebration included swimming races, a bathtub race and a log chop competition.

Part of Fontanini's original farm now houses a winery called Fonty's Pool Wines, which is adjacent to the pool on Seven Day Road. The 330-hectare (820-acre) winery, established in 1989, also produces avocados and truffles.

Fonty's Pool holds 18 million litres (4.8 million US gallons) of water, with a winter flow rate of 44,000 litres per hour (12,000 gal/h). The pool covers nearly 4,000 square metres (1 acre).

== Sources ==
- Fonty's Pool and Caravan Park (n.d.a). Where it all Began: Fonty's Pool (Information board). Fonty's Pool. Jardee, Western Australia. First board.
- Fonty's Pool and Caravan Park (n.d.b). Where it all Began: Fonty's Pool (Information board). Fonty's Pool. Jardee, Western Australia. Second board.
