= Beaver Meadow Pond =

Lake in Delaware County, New York, United States

- Location of Beaver Meadow Pond within New York
- Location: Delaware County, New York
- Coordinates: 42°01′50″N 75°12′18″W
- Primary inflows: Dry Brook
- Primary outflows: Dry Brook
- Surface area: 15 acres (0.023 mi^{2}; 6.1 ha)
- Surface elevation: 1,722 feet (525 m)
- Settlements: Readburn

Beaver Meadow Pond is a small lake northwest of Readburn in Delaware County, New York. It drains southwest via Dry Brook, which flows into Read Creek. Hawk Mountain is located southwest of Beaver Meadow Pond.

== See also ==
- List of lakes in New York
