= Eastbrook =

Eastbrook could refer to the following:

- Eastbrook, Maine, a town in Hancock County, Maine, USA
- Eastbrook, Pennsylvania, an unincorporated community in Lawrence County, Pennsylvania, USA
- Eastbrook High School, a public high school in Marion, Indiana, USA
- Eastbrook railway station, Dinas Powys, Wales
- Eastbrook School, a secondary school in London
- Eastbrook, Western Australia, a locality of the Shire of Manjimup, Western Australia
- The Eastbrook, a public house in Dagenham, London

== See also ==
- East Brook (disambiguation)
