= Bibbulmun =

Bibbulmun may refer to:

- The Bibulman tribe, the traditional owners of the southwestern region of Western Australia, a dialectal group of the Noongar language tribe
- The Bibbulmun Track, a long walking trail in Western Australia, named after the Bibbulmun of Perth
