= Dry Brook (Read Creek tributary) =

- Location of the mouth of Dry Brook

Location
- Country: United States
- State: New York
- County: Delaware

Physical characteristics
- Source
  - coordinates: 42°02′17″N 75°12′40″W
- Mouth: Read Creek
  - coordinates: 42°00′50″N 75°10′25″W
  - elevation: 1,152 ft (351 m)

Dry Brook is a river in Delaware County, New York. It flows through Beaver Meadow Pond before converging with Read Creek north of Readburn.
