= Trask Pond =

Lake in Delaware County, New York, United States

- Location of Trask Pond within New York
- Location: Delaware County, New York
- Coordinates: 42°04′10″N 75°12′17″W
- Basin countries: United States
- Surface area: 11 acres (4.5 ha)
- Surface elevation: 1,703 ft (519 m)
- Settlements: Rock Rift

Trask Pond is a small lake southwest of Rock Rift in Delaware County, New York. It drains south via an unnamed creek that flows into Read Creek, which flows into the East Branch Delaware River. Merrick Pond is located west and Rock Rift Mountain is located east of Trask Pond.

== See also ==
- List of lakes in New York
