= Merrick Pond =

Lake in Delaware County, New York, United States

- Location of Merrick Pond within New York
- Location: Delaware County, New York
- Coordinates: 42°04′03″N 75°13′08″W
- Basin countries: United States
- Surface area: 22 acres (8.9 ha)
- Surface elevation: 1,919 ft (585 m)
- Settlements: Rock Rift

Merrick Pond is a small lake southwest of Rock Rift in Delaware County, New York. It drains east via Read Creek which flows into the East Branch Delaware River. Perkins Pond is located west and Trask Pond is located east of Merrick Pond.

== See also ==
- List of lakes in New York
