= Lake Muir, Western Australia =

Locality in the Shire of Manjimup, Western Australia

Lake Muir
- other
- Coordinates: 34.54622°S 116.60729°E
- Country: Australia
- State: Western Australia
- LGA: Shire of Manjimup
- Location: 295 km (183 mi) from Perth; 54 km (34 mi) from Manjimup

Government
  - State electorate: Warren-Blackwood
  - Federal division: O'Connor

Area
  - Total: 713.3 km^{2} (275.4 sq mi)

Population
  - Total: 7 (SAL 2021)
- Postcode: 6258
Localities around Lake Muir
Perup	Mordalup	Frankland River
Quinninup	Lake Muir	Frankland River
Shannon	North Walpole	Rocky Gully

Lake Muir is a rural locality of the Shire of Manjimup in the South West region of Western Australia. The South Western Highway forms the south-western border of the locality while the Muir Highway forms its northern one. Parts of Shannon National Park as well as most of Lake Muir National Park and all of Lake Muir and Boyndaminup National Park are located in the locality of Lake Muir.

== History ==
Lake Muir is on the traditional lands of the Mineng people of the Noongar nation.

The heritage listed Lake Muir Homestead is located on the western shore of Lake Muir, within the locality. It dates to 1865 and was established by early pioneer Andrew Muir.

In the north-west of the locality of Lake Muir, the townsite of Strachan was gazetted in July 1957, at the site of the Tone River Mill. Designed by the State Housing Commission for the mill employees, the Surveyor-General originally suggested the name Twakerup, the local Aboriginal name for the area. This name was not favored by local residents and it was named Strachan in commemoration of two old pioneers of the district. The name was never widely accepted by the public and, instead, the area is still referred to as Tone River. The Tone River Wilderness Cottages are now on the shire's heritage list. The entire Tone River settlement closed in 2008 and was sold for A$559,090 by the Western Australian government in 2017. It was put up for sale again in 2018, after development plans for a tourist site fell through. Because of its zoning as a tourism site, it cannot be permanently lived in.
