= Rich Creek (Read Creek tributary) =

- Location of the mouth of Rich Creek

Location
- Country: United States
- State: New York
- County: Delaware

Physical characteristics
- Source
  - coordinates: 42°04′43″N 75°10′39″W
- Mouth: Read Creek
  - coordinates: 42°03′10″N 75°11′45″W
  - elevation: 1,493 ft (455 m)

Rich Creek is a river in Delaware County, New York. It flows into Read Creek north-northwest of Readburn.
