= East Brook (Read Creek tributary) =

- Location of the mouth of East Brook

Location
- Country: United States
- State: New York
- County: Delaware

Physical characteristics
- Source
  - coordinates: 42°04′13″N 75°09′47″W
- Mouth: Read Creek
  - coordinates: 42°01′13″N 75°10′24″W
  - elevation: 1,191 ft (363 m)

East Brook is a river in Delaware County, New York. It flows into Read Creek north of Readburn.
