= Gloucester National Park =

National park in Australia

- IUCN category II (national park)
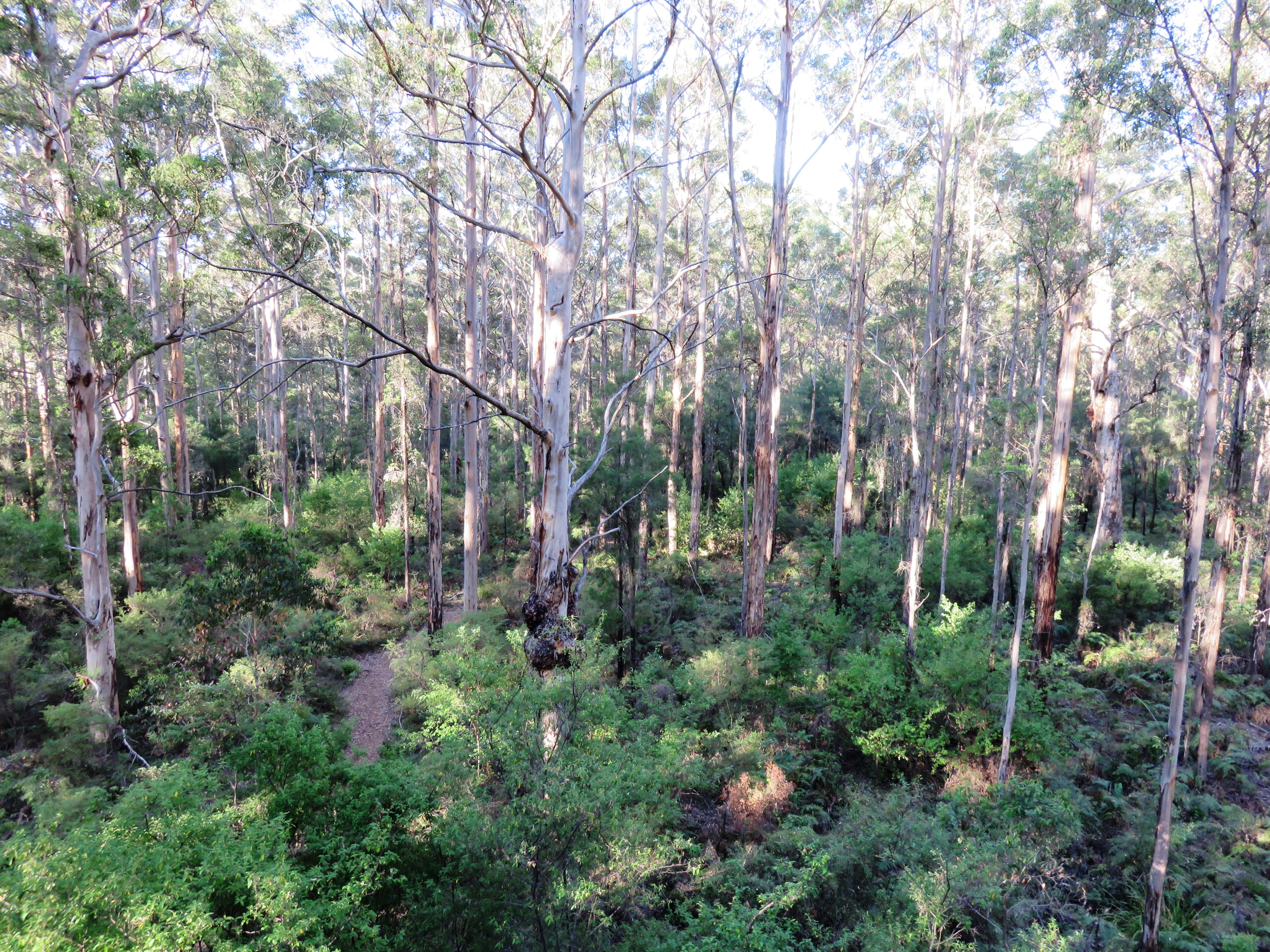
- View of the karri forest from Gloucester Tree Tower in 2015

- Location within Western Australia
- Location: Western Australia
- Nearest city: Pemberton
- Coordinates: 34°26′40″S 116°03′31″E
- Area: 8.78 km^{2} (3.39 sq mi)
- Established: 1993
- Governing body: Department of Environment and Conservation
- Website: Official website

Gloucester National Park is a national park in Western Australia, 281 km south of Perth and about 3 km from Pemberton.

This park contains the Gloucester Tree, a renowned karri tree. Visitors can climb up to a viewing platform 60 m above the ground, using the climbing pegs inserted into the tree. The tree and the park are named after the city of Gloucester, England in 1946.

The tree served as a fire lookout and had the platform, cabin and climbing pegs installed in 1947, it was one of eight lookout trees constructed in the area between 1937 and 1952.

By 1963, it was estimated that over 3,000 people had climbed the tree, and in 1973 the original wooden cabin was demolished and replaced with an aluminium and steel cabin and gallery.

Another attraction in the park is The Cascades, a cascade waterfall in Lefroy Brook.

== See also ==
- Protected areas of Western Australia
