= Perkins Pond =

Lake in Delaware County, New York

- Location of Perkins Pond within New York
- Location: Delaware County, New York
- Coordinates: 42°04′07″N 75°14′14″W
- Basin countries: United States
- Surface area: 28 acres (11 ha)
- Surface elevation: 1,765 ft (538 m)
- Settlements: Rock Rift

Perkins Pond is a small lake southwest of Rock Rift in Delaware County, New York. It drains southwest via an unnamed creek that flows into Cadosia Creek, which flows into the East Branch Delaware River. Merrick Pond is located east of Perkins Pond.

== See also ==
- List of lakes in New York
