= Dingup, Western Australia =

Dingup
- other
- Coordinates: 34°19′17″S 116°14′51″E
- Country: Australia
- State: Western Australia
- LGA: Shire of Manjimup
- Location: 8 km (5.0 mi) from Manjimup

Government
  - State electorate: Warren-Blackwood
  - Federal division: O'Connor

Area
  - Total: 95.1 km^{2} (36.7 sq mi)

Population
  - Total: 195 (SAL 2021)
- Postcode: 6258
Localities around Dingup
Manjimup	Balbarrup	Balbarrup
Middlesex	Dingup	Perub
Middlesex	Upper Warren	Upper Warren

Dingup is a rural locality of the Shire of Manjimup in the South West region of Western Australia. The Muir Highway forms the western and southern border of the locality.

The gazetted townsite of Balbarrup is located within Dingup while the locality of Balbarrup is actually to the north of it.
