= Read Creek =

Location
- Country: United States
- State: New York
- County: Delaware

Physical characteristics
- Source: Merrick Pond
  - location: SW of Rock Rift
  - coordinates: 42°03′56″N 75°13′05″W
  - elevation: 1,919 ft (585 m)
- Mouth: East Branch Delaware River
  - location: NE of Fishs Eddy
  - coordinates: 41°58′47″N 75°09′54″W
  - elevation: 961 ft (293 m)
- Basin size: 17.2 mi^{2} (45 km^{2})

Basin features
- Tributaries
  - left: Rich Creek, East Brook
  - right: Dry Brook

Read Creek is a river in Delaware County, New York. It drains Merrick Pond and flows east until it meets the unnamed creek that drains Trask Pond, then begins flowing south receiving its other tributaries before converging with the East Branch Delaware River northeast of Fishs Eddy.
