= Lois Lake =

- Location within Vancouver Island
- Location: Vancouver Island, British Columbia
- Coordinates: 49°25′16.6″N 125°08′06.8″W
- Lake type: Natural lake
- Basin countries: Canada

Lois Lake is a lake located on Vancouver Island, Canada, north of Great Central Lake, south of Elsie Lake.

== See also ==
- List of lakes of British Columbia
