= Pemberton Tramway Company =

Tourist railway company in Western Australia

Coordinates: 34°26′35″S 116°01′59″E

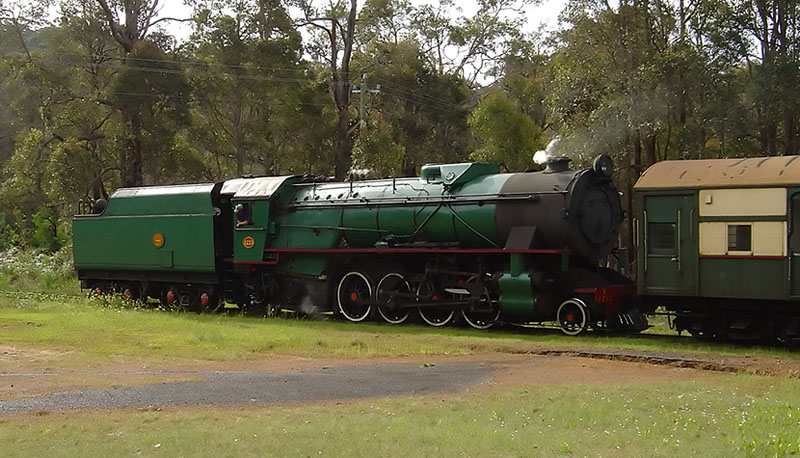
Ex-WAGR steam locomotive V1213 in Pemberton

Pemberton Tramway Company operates as a tourist railway in Pemberton in Western Australia.

The company controls the southern section of the former Northcliffe branch railway, from Lyall to Northcliffe.

Trams ran south from the old WAGR railway station at Pemberton to the Cascades. Previously, tramway services operated as far as Northcliffe, and steam-hauled train services, using WAGR V class No. 1213, operated to Eastbrook and Lyall.

The Pemberton Tramway Company ceased operations on 6 February 2023. Under new owners, it resumed operations in June/July 2023.
