= Jardee, Western Australia =

Jardee
- Town
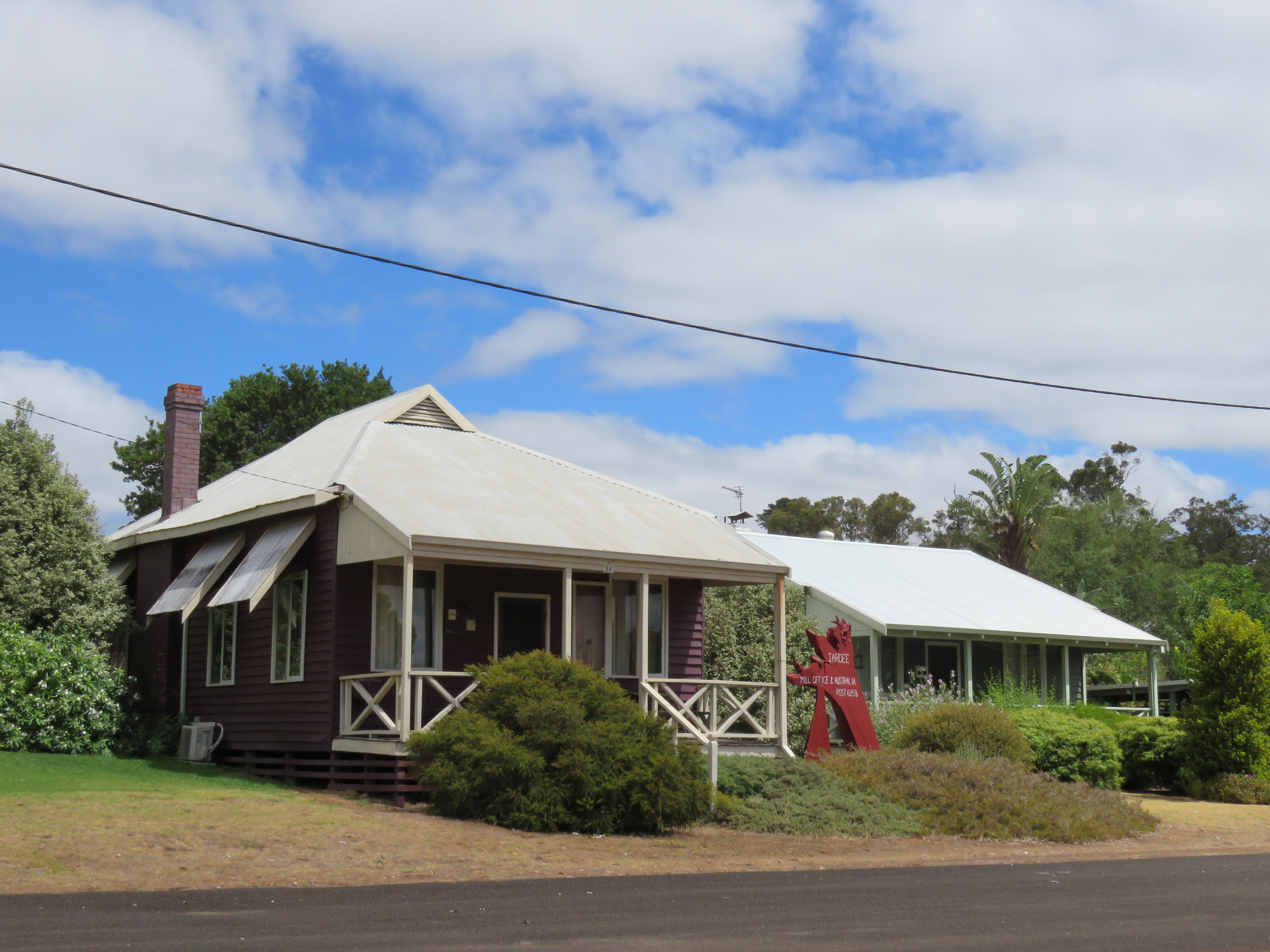
- The former Jardee Mill & Post Office in January 2022

- Interactive map of Jardee
- Coordinates: 34.283°S 116.117°E
- Country: Australia
- State: Western Australia
- LGA: Shire of Manjimup
- Location: 423 km (263 mi) SSE of Perth; 5 km (3.1 mi) SSW of Manjimup
- Established: 1927

Government
  - State electorate: Warren-Blackwood
  - Federal division: O'Connor

Area
  - Total: 42 km^{2} (16 sq mi)
- Elevation: 291 m (955 ft)

Population
  - Total: 157 (SAL 2021)
- Postcode: 6258
Localities around Jardee
Glenoran	Deanmill	Manjimup
Beedelup	Jardee	Middlesex
Channybearup	Diamond Tree	Middlesex

Jardee is a small town in the South West region of Western Australia. It is situated along the South Western Highway between Manjimup and Pemberton.

The name of the town was changed to Jardee in 1925 as it was often confused with Dardanup, and the town was gazetted in 1927.

The name is a portmanteau of the Aboriginal word for the area Jarnadup and the name of a historic property in the area, Deeside.

== Transport ==
Jardee was originally a railway siding named Jarnadup, which had been established in 1912 during the construction of the Bridgetown to Wilgarup railway line. Jarnadup was the terminus built to service the No. 1 state saw mill, also built in 1912. The line would eventually become the Northcliffe railway line.

In 1920 the railway line spread during the visit of Edward Prince of Wales, (the future King Edward VIII) derailing the royal train. In most reports the location was identified as "ten miles from Bridgetown". The last passenger train was in December 1986.
