= Shire of Manjimup =

Coordinates: 34°14′28″S 116°08′46″E

- Local government area
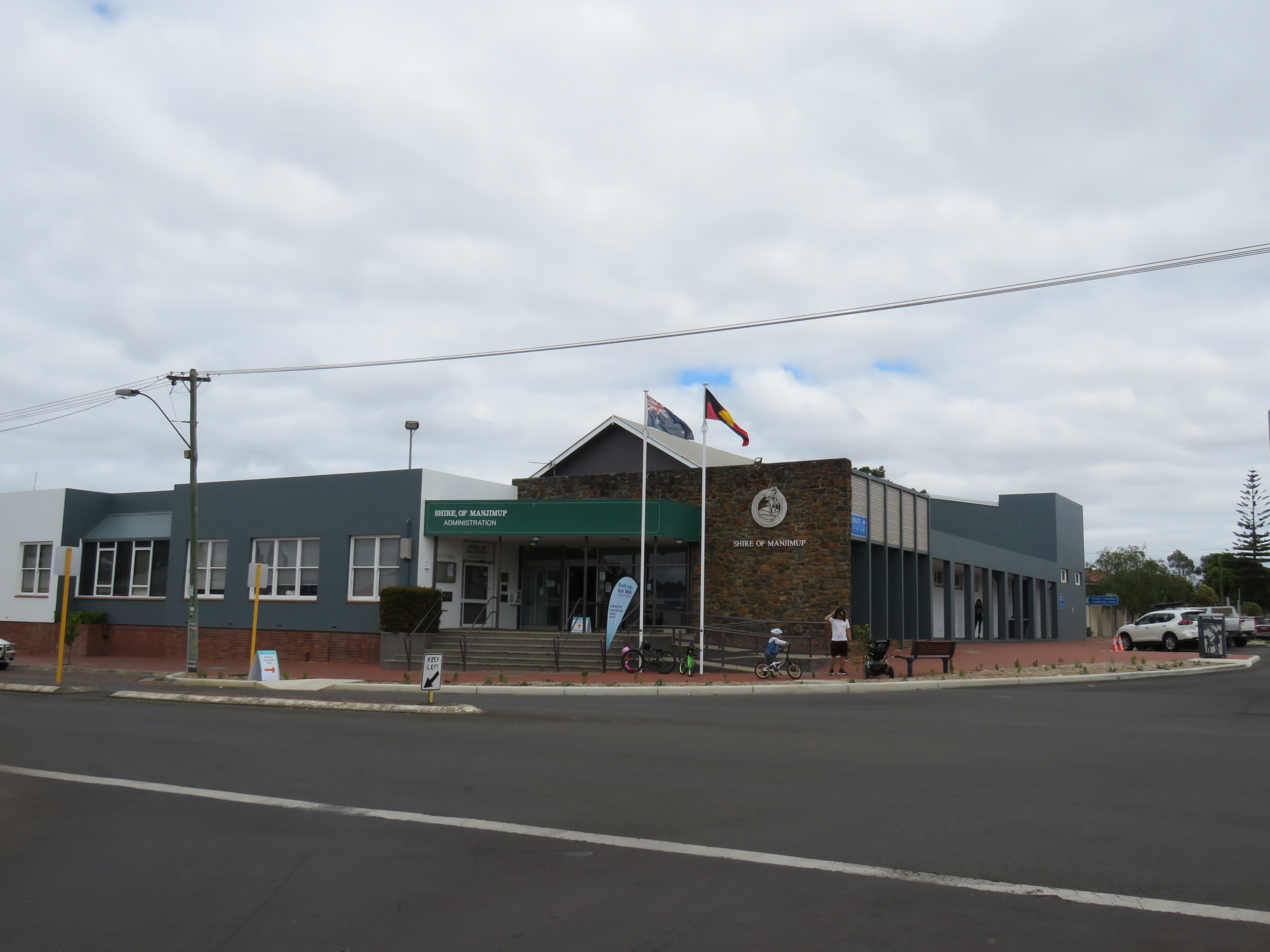
- Manjimup Shire Offices in January 2022

- Interactive map of Shire of Manjimup
- Country: Australia
- State: Western Australia
- Region: South West
- Established: 1908
- Council seat: Manjimup

Government
  - Shire President: Donelle Buegge
  - State electorate: Warren-Blackwood
  - Federal division: O'Connor

Area
  - Total: 7,027.3 km^{2} (2,713.3 sq mi)

Population
  - Total: 9,093 (LGA 2021)
- Website: Shire of Manjimup
LGAs around Shire of Manjimup
Nannup	Bridgetown- Greenbushes	Boyup Brook
Nannup	Shire of Manjimup	Cranbrook; Plantagenet
		Denmark

The Shire of Manjimup is a local government area in the South West region of Western Australia, about 320 kilometres (200 mi) south of the state capital, Perth. The Shire covers an area of 7,027 square kilometres (2,713 sq mi), and its seat of government is the town of Manjimup.

== History ==
The Shire area was first included in the Plantagenet, Wellington and Sussex Road Districts in 1871. Later the area was included in the Nelson Road District.

The Shire of Manjimup originated as the Warren Road District, which was gazetted on 3 July 1908, initially consisting of seven elected members. It was renamed the Manjimup Road District on 23 January 1925. On 1 July 1961, it became the Shire of Manjimup following the passage of the Local Government Act 1960, which reformed all remaining road districts into shires.

== Indigenous people ==
The Shire of Manjimup is located on the traditional land of the Bibulman and Mineng people of the Noongar nation. The Mineng's traditional lands are in the far east of the shire while the Bibulman's traditional lands are in the remainder of the shire.

== Wards ==
The Shire is divided into six wards, most of which were renamed at the 2003 election. The shire president is elected from amongst the councillors.

- Central Ward (Manjimup) (four councillors)
- Coastal Ward (Northcliffe) (one councillor)
- East Ward (Perup) (one councillor)
- North Ward (one councillor)
- South Ward (Walpole) (one councillor)
- West Ward (Pemberton) (two councillors)

== Towns and localities ==
The towns and localities of the Shire of Manjimup with population and size figures based on the most recent Australian census:

Locality	Population	Area	Ward	Map
Balbarrup	144 (SAL 2021)	65.1 km^{2} (25.1 sq mi)	North	
Beedelup	58 (SAL 2021)	160.7 km^{2} (62.0 sq mi)	West	
Boorara Brook	143 (SAL 2021)	280.4 km^{2} (108.3 sq mi)	Coastal	
Broke	17 (SAL 2021)	492.8 km^{2} (190.3 sq mi)	South	
Callcup	11 (SAL 2021)	149.6 km^{2} (57.8 sq mi)	West	
Channybearup	122 (SAL 2021)	116.3 km^{2} (44.9 sq mi)	West	
Collins	49 (SAL 2021)	133.8 km^{2} (51.7 sq mi)	West	
Crowea	97 (SAL 2021)	264.1 km^{2} (102.0 sq mi)	Coastal	
Deanmill	327 (SAL 2021)	28.8 km^{2} (11.1 sq mi)	Central	
Diamond Tree	28 (SAL 2021)	40.3 km^{2} (15.6 sq mi)	West	
Dingup	195 (SAL 2021)	95.1 km^{2} (36.7 sq mi)	East	
Dixvale	68 (SAL 2021)	21.5 km^{2} (8.3 sq mi)	North	
Eastbrook	140 (SAL 2021)	56.4 km^{2} (21.8 sq mi)	West	
Glenoran	97 (SAL 2021)	249.5 km^{2} (96.3 sq mi)	North	
Jardee	157 (SAL 2021)	42 km^{2} (16 sq mi)	West	
Lake Muir	7 (SAL 2021)	713.3 km^{2} (275.4 sq mi)	East	
Linfarne	64 (SAL 2021)	31.5 km^{2} (12.2 sq mi)	North	
Manjimup	4,279 (SAL 2021)	22.4 km^{2} (8.6 sq mi)	Central	
Meerup	159 (SAL 2021)	240.8 km^{2} (93.0 sq mi)	Coastal	
Middlesex	232 (SAL 2021)	82.7 km^{2} (31.9 sq mi)	East	
Mordalup	14 (SAL 2021)	320.4 km^{2} (123.7 sq mi)	East	
North Walpole	108 (SAL 2021)	1,095.4 km^{2} (422.9 sq mi)	South	
Northcliffe	288 (SAL 2021)	27.4 km^{2} (10.6 sq mi)	Coastal	
Palgarup	145 (SAL 2021)	27.4 km^{2} (10.6 sq mi)	North	
Pemberton	861 (SAL 2021)	17.2 km^{2} (6.6 sq mi)	West	
Perup	161 (SAL 2021)	456.5 km^{2} (176.3 sq mi)	East	
Quinninup	172 (SAL 2021)	217.9 km^{2} (84.1 sq mi)	East	
Ringbark	110 (SAL 2021)	25.4 km^{2} (9.8 sq mi)	North	
Shannon	14 (SAL 2021)	671.5 km^{2} (259.3 sq mi)	Coastal	
Smith Brook	59 (SAL 2021)	34.8 km^{2} (13.4 sq mi)	East	
Upper Warren	55 (SAL 2021)	95 km^{2} (37 sq mi)	East	
Walpole	429 (SAL 2021)	56.3 km^{2} (21.7 sq mi)	South	
Wilgarrup	16 (SAL 2021)	36.5 km^{2} (14.1 sq mi)	North	
Windy Harbour	30 (SAL 2021)	217.9 km^{2} (84.1 sq mi)	Coastal	
Yanmah	145 (SAL 2021)	80.9 km^{2} (31.2 sq mi)	North	
Yeagarup	92 (SAL 2021)	361.2 km^{2} (139.5 sq mi)	West	

== Heritage-listed places ==
As of 2023, 271 places are heritage-listed in the Shire of Manjimup, of which 16 are on the State Register of Heritage Places.
