= Warren River (Western Australia) =

River in Western Australia

Location
- Country: Australia

Physical characteristics
- Source
  - location: Tone State Forest
  - elevation: 140 metres (459 ft)
- Mouth
  - location: Southern Ocean
  - coordinates: 34°36′30″S 115°49′57″E
  - elevation: sea level
- Length: 137 kilometres (85 mi)
- Basin size: 4,350 km^{2} (1,680 sq mi)
- Discharge
  - average: 291 GL/a (9.2 m^{3}/s; 326 cu ft/s)

The Warren River is a river in the South West region of Western Australia with a catchment encompassing the towns of Manjimup and Pemberton. The river was named by Governor James Stirling, probably after Admiral Sir John Borlase Warren under whom Stirling served whilst in action in North America in 1813.

== History ==
The river was encountered in 1831 by Lieutenant William Preston RN, first of the Success, then of the Sulphur. Preston was in charge of a boat survey of the south-west coast from Albany to Fremantle. The boat was wrecked near Green Point and Preston and his crew were forced to make the first land journey from Albany to Fremantle, along the coast. Preston was a brother-in-law of Governor Stirling.

The first settler on the Warren was Edward Reveley Brockman, who in 1862, established Warren House homestead and station on the banks of the river.

== Geography ==
The river rises in the Tone State Forest west of Strachan, 30 kilometres (19 mi) south-east of Manjimup. From the confluence of the Tone and Perup Rivers (at Murtinup) it flows 137 kilometres (85 mi) in a south-westerly direction crossing the South Western Highway and then through the Warren State Forest, the Greater Hawke and D'Entrecasteaux National Parks and the Dombakup Nature Reserve, finally discharging into the Southern Ocean near Coolyarbup.

The Warren is a medium-sized river originating in medium rainfall marri/wandoo woodlands, flowing through jarrah/marri forest and high rainfall karri country to the coast. It is the second largest river by streamflow in the Busselton-Walpole region. Tributaries of the Warren River include the Perup, Yerraminnup, Wilgarup and Tone rivers, and Quinninup, Lefroy and Dombakup brooks.

== Salinity ==
Prior to vegetation clearing for agriculture, salinity was recorded as approximately 120–350 mg/L, where <500 mg/L is considered fresh. The Wilgarup, Dombakup and Lefroy sub-catchments were initially cleared around 1925 as part of the Group Settlement Scheme. Extensive clearing in the 1950s and 1960s resulted in a significant increase in stream salinity, with water quality no longer considered fresh. The Warren catchment was declared a clearing control catchment in 1978 following concerns with rising salinity levels. Following this declaration, intensive revegetation was undertaken within the Perup and Tone River sub-catchments, which account for 60% of the salt load entering the Warren River. Salinity levels are leveling off and clearing within the total catchment is now estimated as 35%. The lower Warren River to the river mouth is considered slightly brackish, with a mean annual salinity of 990 mg/L for the period 1993-2002, measured at Barker Road gauging station. Dombakup Brook is recorded as being fresh (< 440 mg/L).
