= Sir James Mitchell National Park =

National park in Western Australia

- IUCN category II (national park)
- Location within Western Australia
- Location: Western Australia
- Coordinates: 34°27′22″S 116°14′23″E
- Area: 2.47 km^{2} (0.95 sq mi)
- Established: 1969
- Governing body: Department of Environment and Conservation

Sir James Mitchell National Park is a national park in the South West region of Western Australia, 284 km south of Perth.

== See also ==
- Protected areas of Western Australia
