= Pemberton, Western Australia =

Pemberton
- Town
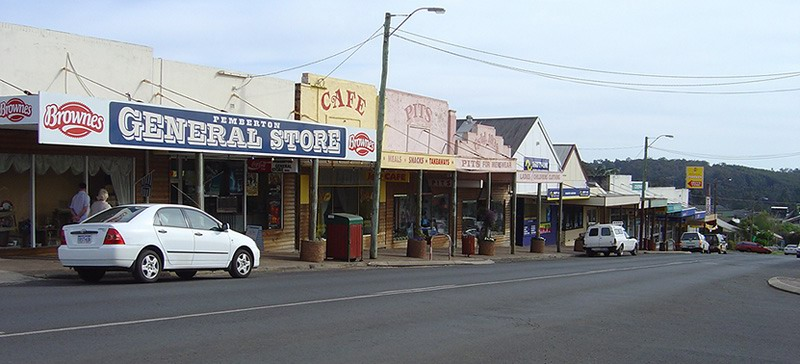
- Pemberton main street

- Interactive map of Pemberton
- Coordinates: 34.445°S 116.034°E
- Country: Australia
- State: Western Australia
- LGA: Shire of Manjimup
- Location: 335 km (208 mi) south of Perth; 156 km (97 mi) south east of Bunbury
- Established: 1913

Government
  - State electorate: Warren-Blackwood
  - Federal division: O'Connor

Area
  - Total: 17.2 km^{2} (6.6 sq mi)
- Elevation: 174 m (571 ft)

Population
  - Total: 617 (UCL 2021)
- Postcode: 6260
- Mean max temp: 20.2 °C (68.4 °F)
- Mean min temp: 10.0 °C (50.0 °F)
- Annual rainfall: 1,188.5 mm (46.79 in)
Localities around Pemberton
Eastbrook	Eastbrook	Eastbrook
Channybearup	Pemberton	Collins
Collins	Collins	Collins

Pemberton is a town in the South West region of Western Australia, named after original settler Pemberton Walcott.

== History ==
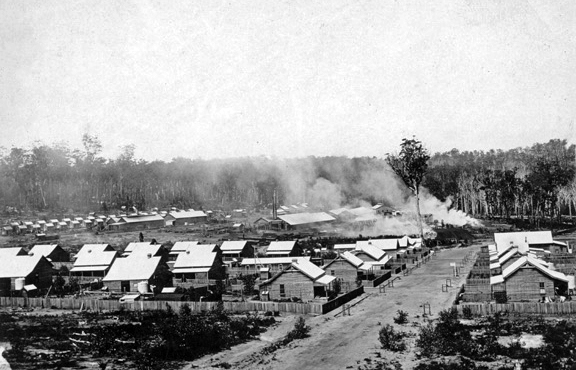
Pemberton in 1919

The region was originally occupied by the Bibbulmun people who knew the area as Wandergarup, which in their language meant 'plenty of water'.

=== 19th century ===
Following an expedition to the area in 1861 by Edward Reveley Brockman, his brother-in-law Gerald de Courcy Lefroy and his uncle Pemberton Walcott, in 1862 Brockman established Warren House homestead and station on the Warren River; Walcott, after whom the town would be named, established Karri Dale farm on the northern outskirts of the later townsite; and Lefroy established a farm and flour mill on Lefroy Brook (the current site of the 100 Year Forest). Walcott remained until at least 1867. By 1868 he was at Dwalganup Station near Boyup Brook, and in 1872 Karri Dale was for sale, marketed as a "four-roomed brick cottage, stockyards, cattle shed, good garden - stocked with fruit trees and permanent running water".

=== 20th century ===
In 1913, the new government-owned State Saw Mills began construction of twin sawmills, No 2 and No 3, at the location then known as Big Brook, to supply half a million railway sleepers for the Trans-Australian Railway. The mill site was in a valley to ensure the mills had a regular supply of water and because it was easier to roll logs down hill to the mills. Big Brook became a thriving private mill town, with a hall, store, staff accommodation, mill workers' cottages, and single men's huts, and two boarding houses. A more distinctive name was soon sought. The name Walcott was suggested but was rejected by the Post Office due to conflict with Port Walcott, also named after Walcott. William Locke Brockman, local farmer and son of early settler Edward Reveley Brockman, suggested Pemberton. The mill town was well established but by 1921 there was community agitation for a government townsite to be declared. Community pressure resulted in lots being surveyed in 1925 and the Pemberton townsite was gazetted in October 1925.

During the 1920s the area was a focus of the Group Settlement Scheme and following the Second World War the War Service Land Settlement Scheme, but with only moderate success.

During the 1980s, Pemberton began to grow as a tourist town and tourism, particularly domestic, continues to play a key role.

=== 21st century ===
Log sawmilling was still the most active industry in 2005, occupying 12.8% of the workforce, despite the state government drastically reducing old growth logging in 2003. Rather than shut down, the mill switched to plantation Tasmanian blue gum and pine in addition to karri.

Viticulture has become widely established, with many investment schemes buying up large areas of pastureland and converting to vineyards.

== Transport ==
The Pemberton Tramway Company operates on a section of the former Northcliffe railway line, a railway line to Northcliffe that is otherwise disused.

== Attractions ==
Nearby, there are two climbable karri trees, each more than 60 metres (200 ft) tall. The most famous is the Gloucester Tree, but there is also the Dave Evans Bicentennial Tree, the tallest of the two at around 71 metres. The trees have metal rungs that allow visitors to climb them and reach the constructed lookout at the top. Currently, the Gloucester Tree is closed to climbing, due to structural concerns with the upper platform, identified during an engineering assessment.

The former climbable Diamond Tree was closed for climbing in 2019.

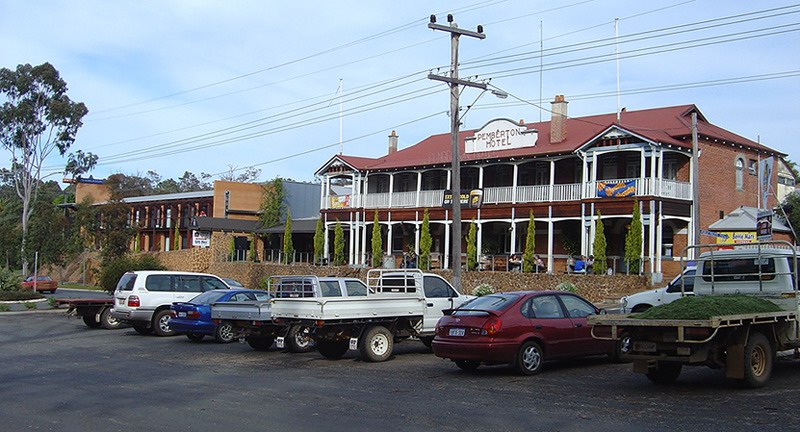
Pemberton Hotel

Other tourist attractions include the Yeagarup Dunes and the Bibbulmun Track. Tours include river cruises, hiking, canoeing and four-wheel drive tours of the national parks.

The three-day Southern Forests Festival (formerly the Pemberton Autumn Festival/Marron & Wine Festival) is held in May. Pemberton is recognised as one of the premier cool-climate wine regions in Australia, and hosts many wineries in the region.

Pemberton is surrounded by karri forest with five national parks within 20 minutes' drive and has plenty of rivers, streams and dams for recreation. The Karri Forest Explorer Drive, developed by the Department of Environment and Conservation, links the tourist attractions with sealed and unsealed roads.

Forest attractions include Big Brook Dam in the Pemberton State Forest, built in 1986, 6 km north on the Bibbulmun Track. Facilities include bird hides, jetties, barbecues and a sandy beach. There is a 4 km sealed walk trail around the lake.

Beedelup Falls in the Beedelup National Park are 30 km north along The Bibbulmun Track. Visitors can explore via a suspension bridge, walk trails and visitor information. The Falls are the break between the Darling Scarp and the Scott River Plain and the tourist drive is sealed with caravan parking.

The Yeagarup Dunes in the D'Entrecasteaux National Park are the largest land-locked inland dunes in the southern hemisphere. They are moving at four metres a year towards the Yeagarup Lake. Local 4WD tours are available.

Lake Jasper in the D’Entrecasteaux National Park is a natural freshwater lake that covers an area of about 450 hectares. It has no inlets nor outlets, is 10 metres deep, and accessible only by 4WD. Further west is Black Point, in the far north-western part of the D’Entrecasteaux National Park between Augusta and Windy Harbour. The black Basalt columns were formed about 135 million years ago. Local tours are available.

The Cascades are a series of low falls in the Lefroy brook. The road has been sealed and is accessible from the historic Tram, which departs from Pemberton twice daily.

== Climate ==
Pemberton has a Mediterranean climate, with warm, dry summers and cool, rainy winters.

Climate data for Pemberton, Western Australia (normals 1991-2020, extremes 1957-2024)
Month	Jan	Feb	Mar	Apr	May	Jun	Jul	Aug	Sep	Oct	Nov	Dec	Year
Record high °C (°F)	43.2 (109.8)	41.7 (107.1)	40.0 (104.0)	33.8 (92.8)	28.5 (83.3)	23.2 (73.8)	22.0 (71.6)	25.4 (77.7)	28.4 (83.1)	33.6 (92.5)	38.0 (100.4)	40.4 (104.7)	43.2 (109.8)
Mean maximum °C (°F)	36.5 (97.7)	36.4 (97.5)	35.6 (96.1)	29.9 (85.8)	24.9 (76.8)	20.7 (69.3)	19.9 (67.8)	21.3 (70.3)	23.7 (74.7)	28.2 (82.8)	32.4 (90.3)	35.2 (95.4)	38.7 (101.7)
Mean daily maximum °C (°F)	26.7 (80.1)	27.1 (80.8)	25.2 (77.4)	22.3 (72.1)	19.1 (66.4)	16.7 (62.1)	15.8 (60.4)	16.3 (61.3)	17.4 (63.3)	19.8 (67.6)	22.3 (72.1)	24.9 (76.8)	21.1 (70.0)
Daily mean °C (°F)	20.1 (68.2)	20.5 (68.9)	19.2 (66.6)	16.9 (62.4)	14.4 (57.9)	12.5 (54.5)	11.6 (52.9)	11.9 (53.4)	12.7 (54.9)	14.6 (58.3)	16.6 (61.9)	18.5 (65.3)	15.8 (60.4)
Mean daily minimum °C (°F)	13.4 (56.1)	13.8 (56.8)	13.1 (55.6)	11.5 (52.7)	9.6 (49.3)	8.3 (46.9)	7.3 (45.1)	7.5 (45.5)	7.9 (46.2)	9.3 (48.7)	10.8 (51.4)	12.0 (53.6)	10.4 (50.7)
Mean minimum °C (°F)	8.4 (47.1)	8.6 (47.5)	7.6 (45.7)	6.3 (43.3)	4.8 (40.6)	3.6 (38.5)	2.8 (37.0)	3.0 (37.4)	3.6 (38.5)	4.5 (40.1)	5.8 (42.4)	7.1 (44.8)	1.8 (35.2)
Record low °C (°F)	4.0 (39.2)	5.6 (42.1)	3.9 (39.0)	−0.8 (30.6)	2.0 (35.6)	−0.4 (31.3)	0.0 (32.0)	0.0 (32.0)	0.4 (32.7)	0.6 (33.1)	2.5 (36.5)	4.4 (39.9)	−0.8 (30.6)
Average precipitation mm (inches)	23.5 (0.93)	17.5 (0.69)	34.3 (1.35)	60.1 (2.37)	141.1 (5.56)	169.9 (6.69)	199.1 (7.84)	176.6 (6.95)	150.2 (5.91)	75.6 (2.98)	60.0 (2.36)	37.3 (1.47)	1,145.2 (45.1)
Average precipitation days	8.2	7.7	10.8	15.2	18.9	22.6	25.1	24.2	21.3	17.1	13.2	10.6	194.9
Average dew point °C (°F)	13.4 (56.1)	13.4 (56.1)	12.8 (55.0)	12.1 (53.8)	10.9 (51.6)	9.8 (49.6)	8.9 (48.0)	8.6 (47.5)	8.9 (48.0)	9.8 (49.6)	11.1 (52.0)	12.2 (54.0)	11.0 (51.8)
Mean monthly sunshine hours	282.1	245.8	229.4	180.0	145.7	123.0	127.1	151.9	159.0	217.0	219.0	260.4	2,340.4
Source: The Bureau of Meteorology
