= Bibulman =

Aboriginal people of Western Australia

The Bibulman (Pibelmen) are an Aboriginal Australian people of the southwestern region of Western Australia, a subgroup of the Noongar.

== Name ==
Their autonym may be related to the word for stingray, pibilum.

== Country ==
Pibelmen lands comprised around 8,000 square kilometres (3,100 mi^{2}) of territory in the southwest. They were concentrated around the Lower Blackwood River and the hills between the Blackwood and the Warren River. Their eastern flank ran to Gardner River and Broke Inlet. The Scott River was also a part of their territory. Their inland extension ran to Manjimup and Bridgetown.

== Alternative names ==
- Pepelman, Peopleman, Piblemen
- Bibulman, Bibulmun, Bibudmoun, Bibbulmun, Bebleman
- Bibilum
- Meeraman (Koreng exonym)
- Murram (Menang exonym)
- Bajongwongi (language name)

== Some words ==
- mammon (father)
- nungun (mother)
- jangar (white man)
- dwardar (tame dog)
- yakine (wild dog)
- yonger (kangaroo)
- wager (emu)

== Sources ==
- Bates, Daisy (January–June 1914). "A Few Notes on Some South-Western Australian Dialects". The Journal of the Royal Anthropological Institute of Great Britain and Ireland. 44: 65–82. doi:10.2307/2843531. JSTOR 2843531.
- Gifford, Lord Edric Frederick (1886). "Lower Blackwood. Peopleman tribe" (PDF). In Curr, Edward Micklethwaite (ed.). The Australian race: its origin, languages, customs, place of landing in Australia and the routes by which it spread itself over the continent. Vol. 1. Melbourne: J. Ferres. pp. 362–363.
- Horton, David R. (1996), The AIATSIS Map of Indigenous Australia, Australian Institute of Aboriginal and Torres Strait Islander Studies, Wikidata Q134423353
- Mathews, R. H. (1910). "Notes on some tribes of Western Australia" (PDF). Queensland Geographical Journal. 25: 119–136.
- Nind, Scott (1831). "Description of the Natives of King George's Sound (Swan River Colony) and Adjoining Country". Journal of the Royal Geographical Society of London. 1: 21–51. doi:10.2307/1797657. JSTOR 1797657.
- "Tindale Tribal Boundaries" (PDF). Department of Aboriginal Affairs, Western Australia. September 2016. Archived from the original (PDF) on 8 March 2016.
- Tindale, Norman Barnett (1974). "Pibelmen (WA)". Aboriginal Tribes of Australia: Their Terrain, Environmental Controls, Distribution, Limits, and Proper Names. Australian National University. Archived from the original on 15 August 2019.
