= Manjimup, Western Australia =

Manjimup
- Town
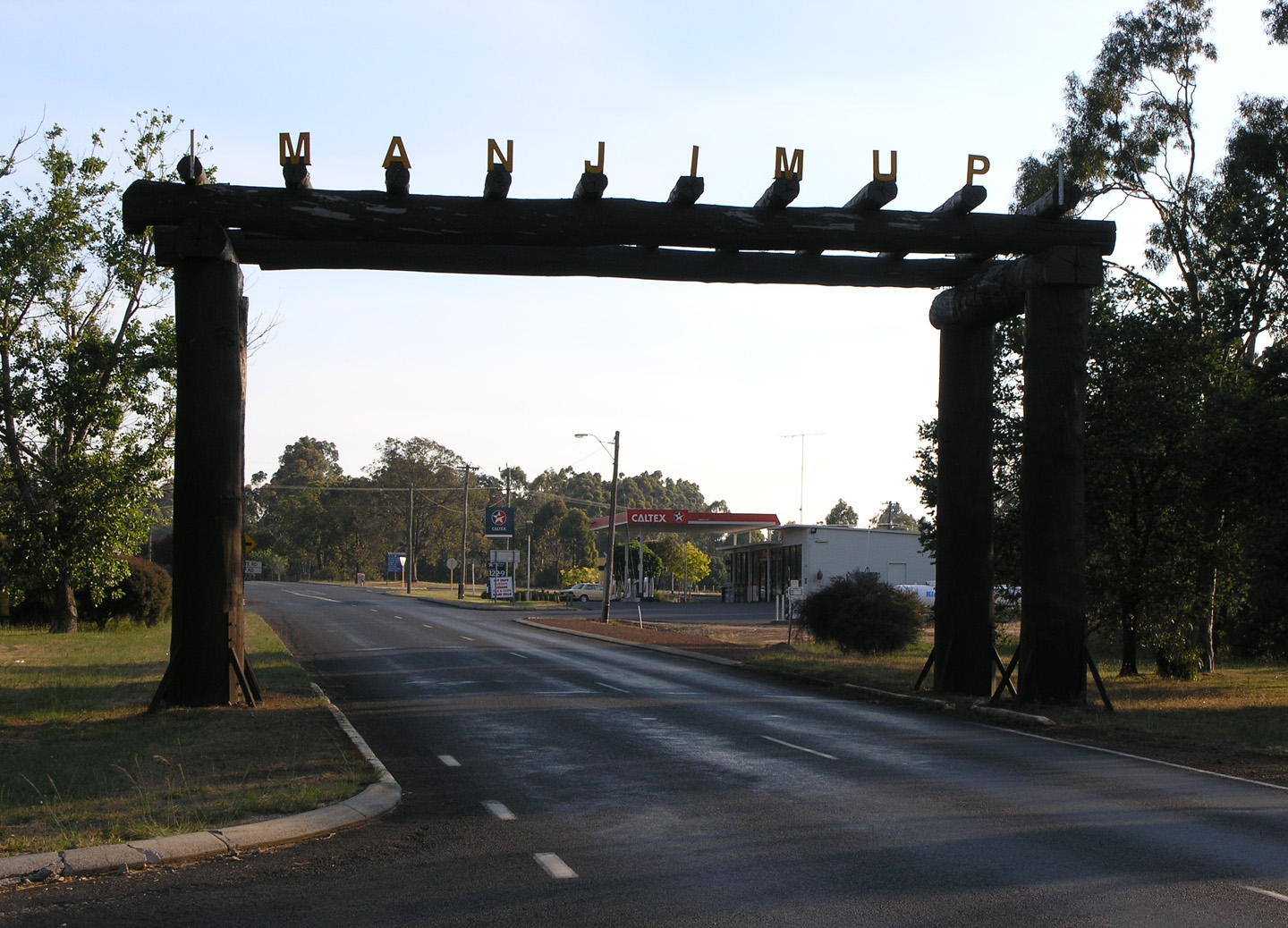
- Entrance to Manjimup, late afternoon

- Interactive map of Manjimup
- Coordinates: 34°14′28″S 116°8′47″E
- Country: Australia
- State: Western Australia
- LGA: Shire of Manjimup
- Location: 293.4 km (182.3 mi) S of Perth; 131 km (81 mi) SE of Bunbury; 36 km (22 mi) S of Bridgetown
- Established: 1856

Government
  - State electorate: Warren-Blackwood
  - Federal division: O'Connor

Area
  - Total: 22.4 km^{2} (8.6 sq mi)
- Elevation: 287 m (942 ft)

Population
  - Total: 4,138 (UCL 2021)
- Postcode: 6258
- Mean max temp: 20.3 °C (68.5 °F)
- Mean min temp: 9.6 °C (49.3 °F)
- Annual rainfall: 1,010.9 mm (39.80 in)
Localities around Manjimup
| Ringbark | Ringbark | Balbarrup |
| Deanmill | Manjimup | Dingup |
| Jardee | Middlesex | Middlesex |

Manjimup is a town in Western Australia, 307 kilometres (191 mi) south of the state capital, Perth. The town of Manjimup is a regional centre for the largest shire in the South West region of Western Australia. At the 2021 census, Manjimup had a population of 4,279.

== History ==
Manjimup was named after the Noongar words "Manjin" (a broad-leafed edible reed) and "up" (meeting place, or place of). Manjimup was first settled by timber cutter Thomas Muir, who took up land near the present town site in 1856. It was declared a town in 1910, and a railway from Perth was completed in 1911.

The population expanded when Manjimup became part of the post-World War I Group Settlement Scheme. The Group Settlement Scheme was largely unsuccessful because the land was difficult to clear and many of the new settlers were not experienced farmers. The settlers who stayed became dairy farmers, which ended during the 1930s Great Depression when the price of butterfat collapsed.

Manjimup hosted an international sporting event in the 1992 Motocross des Nations, the only time Australia has hosted what is essentially the world cup of motocross.

== Economy ==
=== Industry ===
Timber is the town's major industry, but it has been joined by fruit and vegetable farms, dairy farms, wool, grain and vineyards. The Cripps Pink, better known as the Pink Lady apple, was created in Manjimup in 1973 by John Cripps of the Western Australian Department of Agriculture, and the trademark is now used on products across four continents. Manjimup used to produce frozen French fries, and had a lucrative tobacco industry that ended in the 1960s. Manjimup exports include marri flooring; apples, primarily to India; and spring water to Saudi Arabia, Singapore and India.

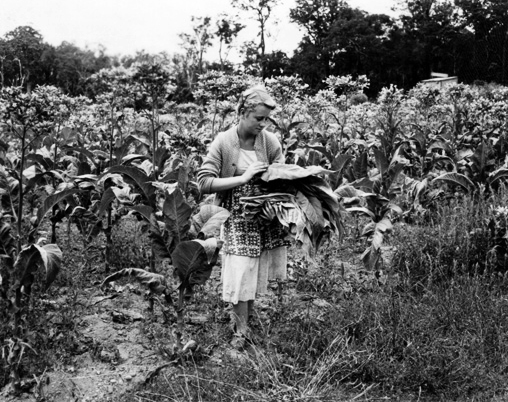
Picking tobacco leaves in 1954

Manjimup is the leading Australian-mainland producer of black truffles, and research on truffle-growing is conducted in collaboration with WA universities, with an annual government grant of $250,000 for three years. Manjimup's climate is similar to that of Périgord and other truffle-growing areas of France. Manjimup truffles are supplied to restaurants in Perth, Sydney and Melbourne, and requests for samples have been received from restaurants in France and Germany.

Research is also being conducted on green tea production by the Department of Agriculture and Food and the Manjimup Horticultural Research Institute. Japanese experts identified Manjimup as a suitable area for growing green tea based on "its climate, 'clean green' image, fertile soils and good rainfall". The Manjimup/Pemberton area is at a similar latitude to the prime tea-growing area Shizuoka in Japan, and shares similar acidic soils and average annual temperature. Trials of ten varieties of green tea will determine which will be the most successful.

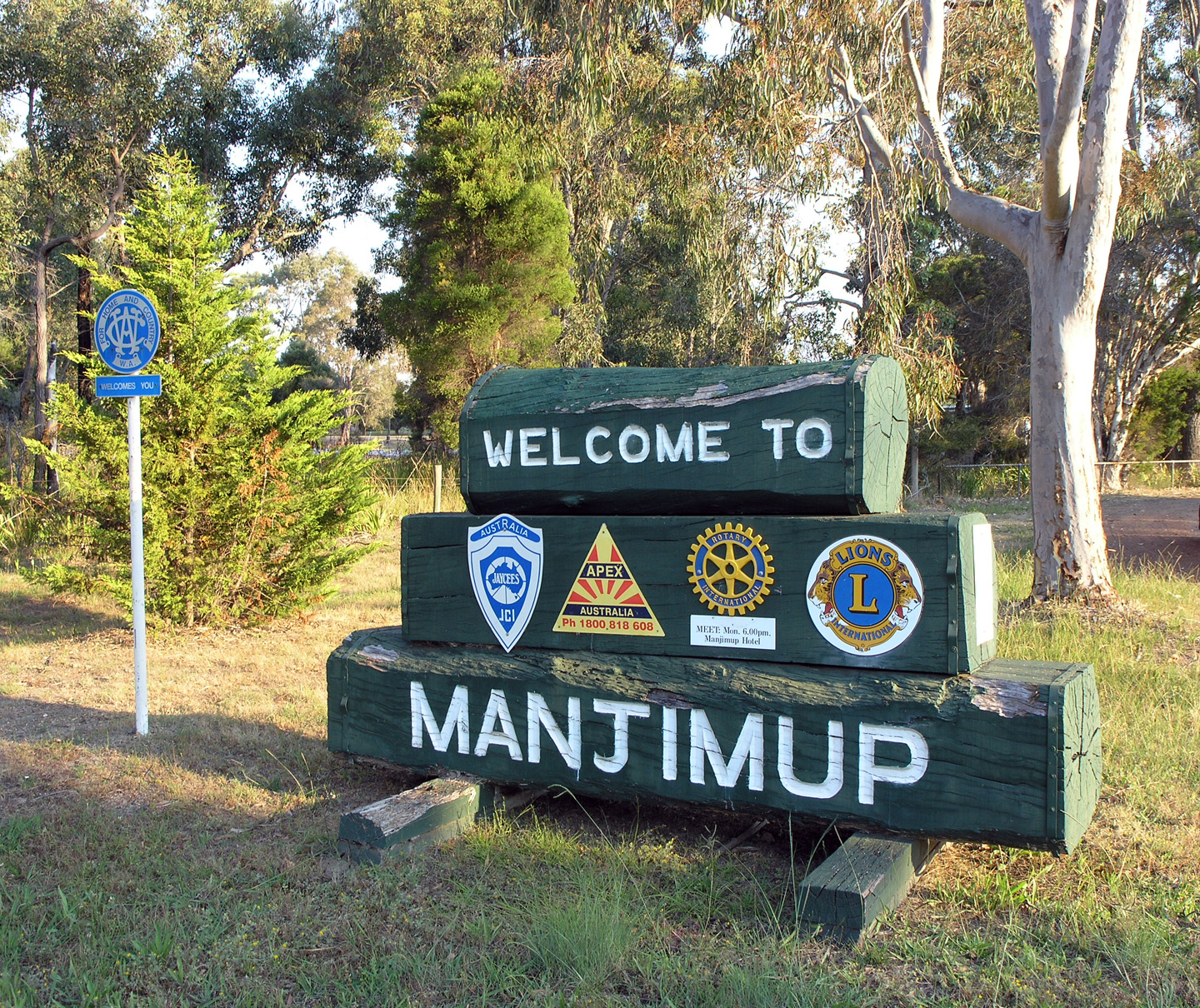
Welcome to Manjimup

=== Tourism ===
Manjimup's tourist attractions include the Diamond Tree fire lookout; the Four Aces, which are four 75-metre-tall (246 ft) karri trees over 400 years old; One Tree Bridge, a bridge made of a single karri tree; Fonty's Pool; a timber museum called Manjimup Timber Park; and timber sawmills including Deanmill. During wildflower season from October to December, the King Jarrah Heritage Trail is home to various native flowers.

Since 2001, an annual cherry festival has been held in December. The three-day festival features the crowning of the cherry king and queen and a cherry pit spitting competition, and is attended by some 5,000 visitors. In 1980, Manjimup held its first motocross event, named the Manjimup 15000 International Motocross in honour of the $15,000 prize for first place. The event was held annually in June until it was cancelled in 2006 due to public liability insurance issues and a lack of volunteers. In 2005, the event drew 6,000 spectators and 340 competitors from Australia, New Zealand and the United States. The event began running again in 2009.

== Education ==
Two public primary schools and one public high school are located in Manjimup along with a Catholic K-12 school, Kearnan College. Manjimup Primary School opened in 1911, and moved to a new location in 2005. Manjimup Primary School had 431 students in semester 2, 2007, with 40 of those students in part-time kindergarten. The student attendance rate is 94%, compared with 93.1% statewide. The school's students tend to remain in Manjimup for their secondary education.

East Manjimup Primary School opened in 1971. Seventy-five percent of students live in the town east of the railway line, with the remaining students from farms or smaller communities out of town or outside the school's catchment area. The school had 331 students in semester 2, 2007, with 36 in part-time kindergarten. Its student attendance rate is 93.2%.

Kearnan College was founded by the Sisters of St Joseph of the Sacred Heart in 1925 and was originally called St Joseph's. The school had 302 students from kindergarten to year 12, as of July 2026. It was only a primary school in its early years; the high school was added under parish priest Father Stephen Kelly in 1970. With this addition, Kearnan College became the first coeducational catholic school in Western Australia.

The town's high school, Manjimup Senior High School, was established in 1957. School facilities were upgraded in 1997 and 1999, with the addition of a Technology and Enterprise Centre and refurbishment of several areas. Over half of its students travel to school on the school's buses, with the most distant students travelling more than 80 km (50 mi), each way, per day. The school catchment area includes Manjimup, Bridgetown, Northcliffe, Pemberton and Boyup Brook. Manjimup Senior High School had 668 students in semester 2, 2007. Selected school programmes are delivered in partnership with South West College of TAFE, Challenger TAFE, and Edith Cowan University. The school consistently performs well in Tertiary Entrance Exam results. In 2007, Manjimup Senior High School was the best performing state school in WA, placed at number 8 in the list of top-performing schools.

== Transportation ==
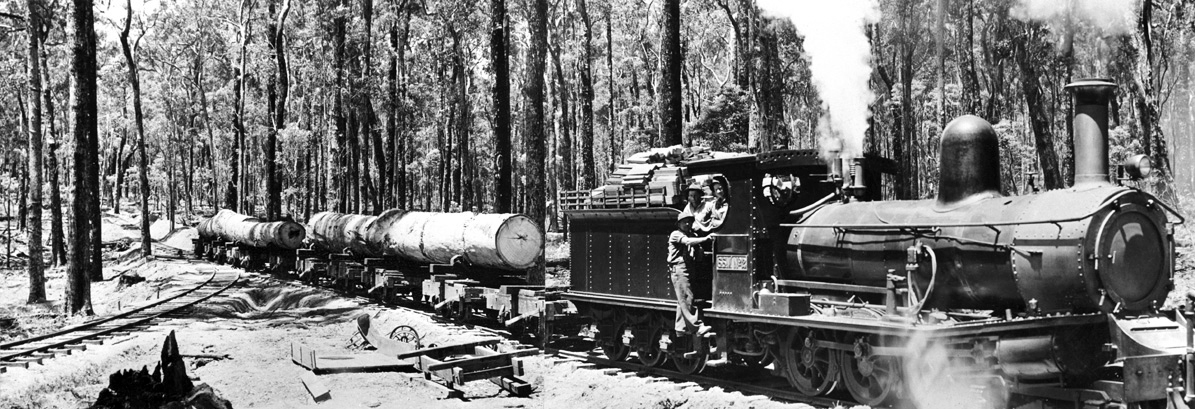
A timber train in the 1940s

The railway from Bridgetown was extended to Wilgarup in 1909, and the railway line opened in 1911. As the line's terminus was near the Manjimup homestead, the station was named Manjimup. It was completed in June 1913. Aside from passengers, trains were used to transport timber to and from the sawmills in the area. It was eventually extended becoming the Northcliffe railway line. In 1969, by which time passenger train services on the line had ceased, a new station building was constructed, to cater for road service passengers, rail freight and parcels traffic. The rail yards closed in 1997 and were redeveloped into Manji Park tourism precinct in 2003.

Cars are the primary method of transport in Manjimup – according to the Australian Bureau of Statistics' 2006 census, 91% of people commuting to work were drivers or passengers in cars. The next most popular method of transport was walking, at 4.5%. The Manjimup Volunteer and Resource Centre runs a community bus service, primarily for youth, seniors, and people with disabilities and the Public Transport Authority contracts school bus services to Warren Bus Service.

Public transport between Perth and Manjimup consists of Transwa bus services 315 (Sunday) and 321 (Monday and Wednesday) from Perth to Pemberton via Bunbury, and 322 (Monday, Tuesday, Thursday) from Pemberton to Perth, also via Bunbury. Travellers can also take the daily Australind train for the Perth to Bunbury portion of the journey. South West Coach Lines travels between Perth and Manjimup on weekdays.

== Politics ==
Manjimup is located in the Western Australian electoral district of Blackwood-Stirling and Federal Division of O'Connor. The statistics below combine votes from the Manjimup and East Manjimup polling places.

2007 federal election Source: AEC
| Liberal | 50.0% |
| Labor | 23.7% |
| Independent | 18.0% |
| Greens | 3.35% |
| CDP | 2.39% |

2005 state election Source: WAEC
| Liberal | 71.5% |
| Labor | 16.1% |
| Greens | 4.02% |
| One Nation | 2.87% |
| Family First | 2.54% |

2004 federal election Source: AEC
| Liberal | 65.9% |
| Labor | 20.2% |
| Greens | 3.73% |
| One Nation | 3.37% |
| CDP | 2.01% |

2001 state election Source: WAEC
| Liberal | 57.4% |
| Independent | 16.4% |
| One Nation | 14.2% |
| Labor | 8.35% |
| Greens | 2.78% |

2001 federal election Source: AEC
| Liberal | 56.1% |
| Labor | 19.5% |
| One Nation | 15.5% |
| Greens | 2.79% |
| Democrats | 2.60% |

1996 state election Source: WAEC
| Liberal | 64.2% |
| Labor | 24.8% |
| CEC | 7.62% |
| Democrats | 3.39% |

=== Forestry issues ===
The Manjimup region has been the focus of forest issues for over 80 years – initially the development of the Group Settlement Scheme saw forests cleared for settlements, then in the 1970s the Manjimup woodchipping scheme attracted widespread interest in the concern for the karri forests of the region. Two conservation groups prominently involved were Campaign to Save Native Forests and South West Forests Defence Foundation. Subsequent to the woodchipping controversies, the issue of old growth forests saw considerable interaction between conservationists and local forestry organisations. The resultant conflicts were in part resolved by government intervention, reducing clearfell quotas and providing schemes to re-deploy forestry workers made redundant by the reduction in the industry.

== Climate ==
Manjimup has a mild Mediterranean climate, with cool wet winters and warm dry summers. Manjimup's longest consecutive run of cold days was 20 days between 13 July and 1 August 1958, and its longest consecutive wet spell was 44 days between 1 July to 13 August 1946. During this period, 374 mm (14.7 in) of rain fell.

Climate data for Manjimup, Western Australia (normals 1991-2020, extremes 1957-present)
| Month | Jan | Feb | Mar | Apr | May | Jun | Jul | Aug | Sep | Oct | Nov | Dec | Year |
|---|---|---|---|---|---|---|---|---|---|---|---|---|---|
| Record high °C (°F) | 42.7 (108.9) | 42.8 (109.0) | 41.2 (106.2) | 34.4 (93.9) | 29.2 (84.6) | 23.1 (73.6) | 21.6 (70.9) | 24.6 (76.3) | 28.8 (83.8) | 33.3 (91.9) | 38.7 (101.7) | 41.1 (106.0) | 42.8 (109.0) |
| Mean maximum °C (°F) | 37.7 (99.9) | 37.0 (98.6) | 36.0 (96.8) | 30.1 (86.2) | 24.7 (76.5) | 20.1 (68.2) | 19.1 (66.4) | 21.0 (69.8) | 23.8 (74.8) | 28.7 (83.7) | 33.2 (91.8) | 36.2 (97.2) | 39.3 (102.7) |
| Mean daily maximum °C (°F) | 27.6 (81.7) | 27.7 (81.9) | 25.4 (77.7) | 22.0 (71.6) | 18.5 (65.3) | 15.9 (60.6) | 14.9 (58.8) | 15.6 (60.1) | 16.9 (62.4) | 19.7 (67.5) | 22.8 (73.0) | 25.6 (78.1) | 21.1 (69.9) |
| Daily mean °C (°F) | 20.5 (68.9) | 20.8 (69.4) | 19.2 (66.6) | 16.7 (62.1) | 13.9 (57.0) | 11.8 (53.2) | 10.8 (51.4) | 11.6 (52.9) | 12.3 (54.1) | 14.3 (57.7) | 16.6 (61.9) | 18.8 (65.8) | 15.6 (60.1) |
| Mean daily minimum °C (°F) | 13.3 (55.9) | 13.8 (56.8) | 13.0 (55.4) | 11.4 (52.5) | 9.3 (48.7) | 7.7 (45.9) | 6.7 (44.1) | 6.9 (44.4) | 7.6 (45.7) | 8.8 (47.8) | 10.4 (50.7) | 11.9 (53.4) | 10.1 (50.1) |
| Mean minimum °C (°F) | 8.7 (47.7) | 8.9 (48.0) | 7.9 (46.2) | 6.3 (43.3) | 4.6 (40.3) | 3.8 (38.8) | 2.8 (37.0) | 2.5 (36.5) | 3.3 (37.9) | 4.1 (39.4) | 5.6 (42.1) | 7.2 (45.0) | 1.9 (35.4) |
| Record low °C (°F) | 5.9 (42.6) | 5.6 (42.1) | 3.3 (37.9) | 1.6 (34.9) | −0.6 (30.9) | 0.2 (32.4) | −0.6 (30.9) | 0.0 (32.0) | 0.6 (33.1) | 0.1 (32.2) | 2.3 (36.1) | 4.4 (39.9) | −0.6 (30.9) |
| Average precipitation mm (inches) | 18.9 (0.74) | 13.4 (0.53) | 28.2 (1.11) | 46.6 (1.83) | 109.5 (4.31) | 124.8 (4.91) | 158.0 (6.22) | 137.0 (5.39) | 107.6 (4.24) | 58.1 (2.29) | 43.2 (1.70) | 28.1 (1.11) | 873.4 (34.38) |
| Average precipitation days | 6.8 | 6.5 | 9.1 | 13.7 | 18.0 | 21.1 | 24.1 | 22.6 | 20.2 | 16.2 | 11.5 | 8.1 | 177.9 |
| Average afternoon relative humidity (%) (at 1500) | 43 | 43 | 48 | 56 | 63 | 70 | 71 | 68 | 65 | 57 | 51 | 46 | 57 |
| Average dew point °C (°F) | 11.0 (51.8) | 11.2 (52.2) | 10.8 (51.4) | 10.5 (50.9) | 9.6 (49.3) | 8.6 (47.5) | 7.8 (46.0) | 7.7 (45.9) | 7.8 (46.0) | 8.4 (47.1) | 9.4 (48.9) | 10.0 (50.0) | 9.4 (48.9) |

== Notable people ==
- Piero Balbo (1916–2003), lawyer, commander of Italian partisan groups 1943–1945, was born in Manjimup.
- John Chester, eco-terrorist with criminal convictions for armed bank robbery, car theft, assault and confinement, theft of explosives and destruction of property. He carried out the 1976 Bunbury woodchip bombing in an attack on the port's woodchip exporting infrastructure.
- Walter Handmer AM (1927–2007), Australian diplomat, lived in Manjimup from the early 1930s until 1944.
- Sam Kekovich (born 1950), former Australian rules footballer who played for North Melbourne and Collingwood in the Victorian Football League (now Australian Football League), and Australian Lamb Meat Ambassador, born in Manjimup.
- Shelly Liddelow (born 1984), Olympic field hockey player, born in Manjimup.
- Marlion Pickett (born 1992), Australian rules footballer who played for Richmond Football Club in the Australian Football League (AFL), lived in Manjimup during his youth.
- Matt Priddis (born 1985), former Australian rules footballer and Brownlow Medal winner who played for the West Coast Eagles in the Australian Football League (AFL), born in Manjimup.
- Marty Zambotto (born 1995), better known as Go-Jo as well as Australia's entry for Eurovision Song Contest 2025, born in Manjimup.
