= Yeagarup, Western Australia =

Locality in the Shire of Manjimup, Western Australia

Yeagarup
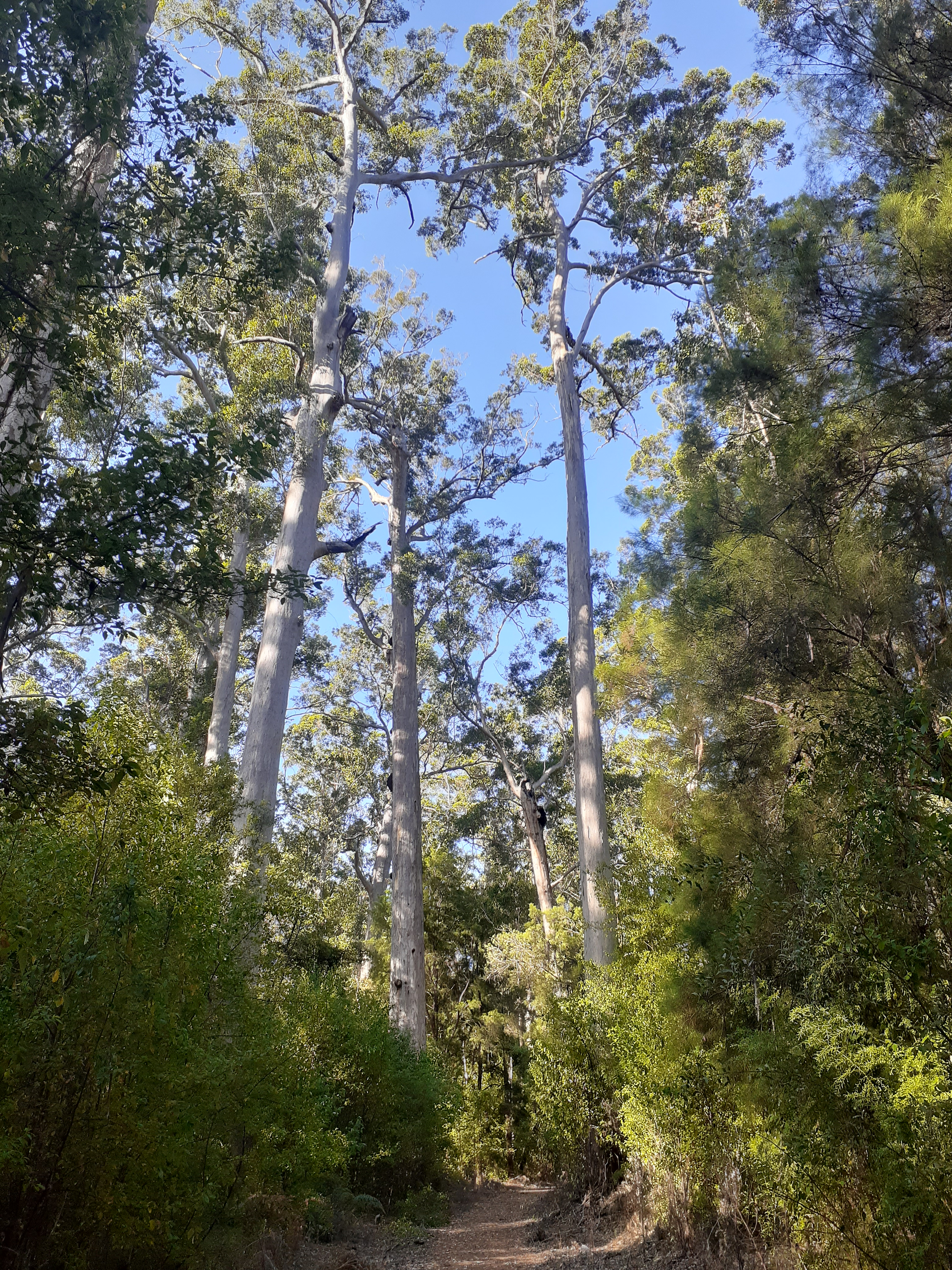
- Old growth karri forest in Warren National Park

- Interactive map of Yeagarup
- Coordinates: 34.53886°S 115.86018°E
- Country: Australia
- State: Western Australia
- LGA: Shire of Manjimup
- Location: 282 km (175 mi) from Perth; 33 km (21 mi) from Manjimup; 10 km (6.2 mi) from Pemberton

Government
  - State electorate: Warren-Blackwood
  - Federal division: O'Connor

Area
  - Total: 361.2 km^{2} (139.5 sq mi)

Population
  - Total: 92 (SAL 2021)
- Postcode: 6260
Localities around Yeagarup
Peerabeelup	Beedelup	Channybearup
Lake Jasper	Yeagarup	Collins
Southern Ocean	Callcup	Callcup

Yeagarup is a rural locality and town of the Shire of Manjimup in the South West region of Western Australia, on the coastline of the Southern Ocean. The Vasse Highway forms the northern border of the locality while the Warren River (approximately 137 km long) forms its southern and the Donnelly River (approximately 192 km long) some of its western border. The D'Entrecasteaux National Park runs along the entire coastline of the locality. Much of the Greater Hawke National Park and all of Warren National Park are also located within Yeagarup.

Yeagarup is located on the traditional land of the Bibulman people of the Noongar nation.

Apart from the karri forest, the Yeagarup dunes, sometimes also spelled as Yeagerup dunes, located within D'Entrecasteaux National Park, are one of the main features of the locality. The dunes are located in the south-east, parallel to the coast, between Yeagarup Lake and Yeagarup Beach and are accessible by 4-wheel drive. The dunes, approximately 10 kilometres (6.2 mi) long, are on the shire's heritage list. Their shifting nature, gradually moving inland, was discovered in the 1930s. An attempt to stop this by planting marram grass on the dunes in 1937 and 1938 failed to stop the movement.

Yeagarup was the name of a stop on the Northcliffe branch railway, but the stop is actually located in what is now the locality of Crowea. The Pemberton to Northcliffe section of the line, passing through Yeagarup, spelled Yeagerup at the time, was officially opened in November 1933.
