= Leioproctus sulcatus =

Scientific classification
- Kingdom: Animalia
- Phylum: Arthropoda
- Clade: Pancrustacea
- Class: Insecta
- Order: Hymenoptera
- Family: Colletidae
- Genus: Leioproctus
- Species: L. sulcatus

Binomial name
- Leioproctus sulcatus Batley, 2025

Species of bee

Leioproctus sulcatus, or Leioproctus (Euryglossidia) sulcatus, is a species of bee in the family Colletidae and subfamily Colletinae. It is endemic to Australia. It was described by entomologist Michael Batley in 2025.

== Etymology ==
The specific epithet sulcatus is a Latin anatomical reference to the depressions in the anterior corners of the propodeal triangle.

== Description ==
The female body length is about 8 mm. Integumental colouration is mainly black, with brown markings. The hair is white to brown.

== Distribution and habitat ==
The species occurs in Western Australia. The type locality is Northcliffe in the South West region.

== Behaviour ==
The adults are flying mellivores. Flowering plants visited by the bees include Eucalyptus species.
