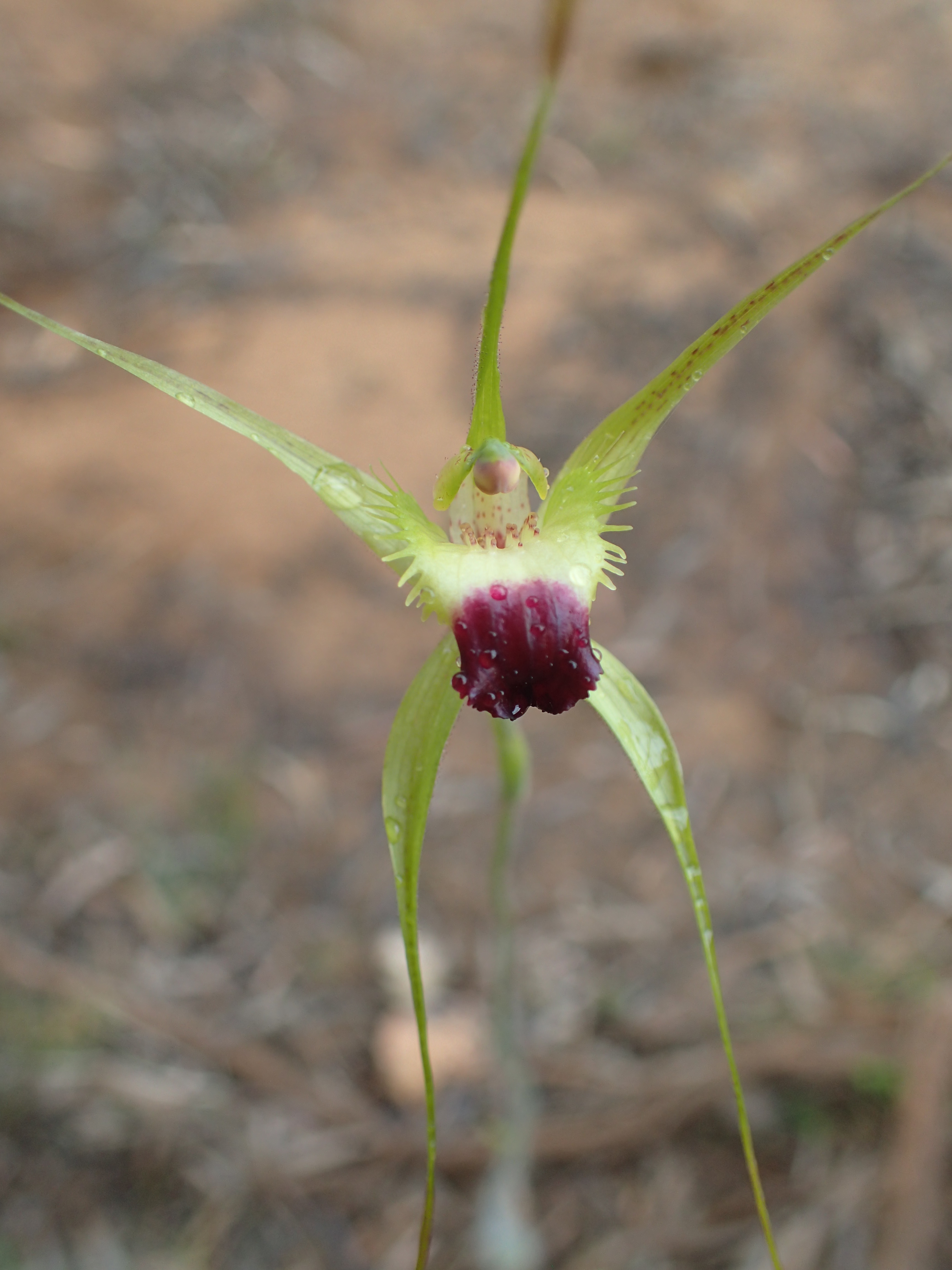
- Near Augusta

Scientific classification
- Kingdom: Plantae
- Clade: Embryophytes
- Clade: Tracheophytes
- Clade: Spermatophytes
- Clade: Angiosperms
- Clade: Monocots
- Order: Asparagales
- Family: Orchidaceae
- Subfamily: Orchidoideae
- Tribe: Diurideae
- Genus: Caladenia
- Species: C. infundibularis

Binomial name
- Caladenia infundibularis A.S.George

Synonyms
- Arachnorchis infundibularis (A.S.George) D.L.Jones & M.A.Clem.; Calonema infundibulare (A.S.George) Szlach.; Calonemorchis infundibularis (A.S.George) Szlach.

= Caladenia infundibularis =

Funnel-web spider orchid

Species of orchid

Caladenia infundibularis, commonly known as the funnel-web spider orchid, is a species of orchid endemic to the south-west of Western Australia. It has a single hairy leaf and up to three greenish-yellow flowers which have a red-tipped labellum.

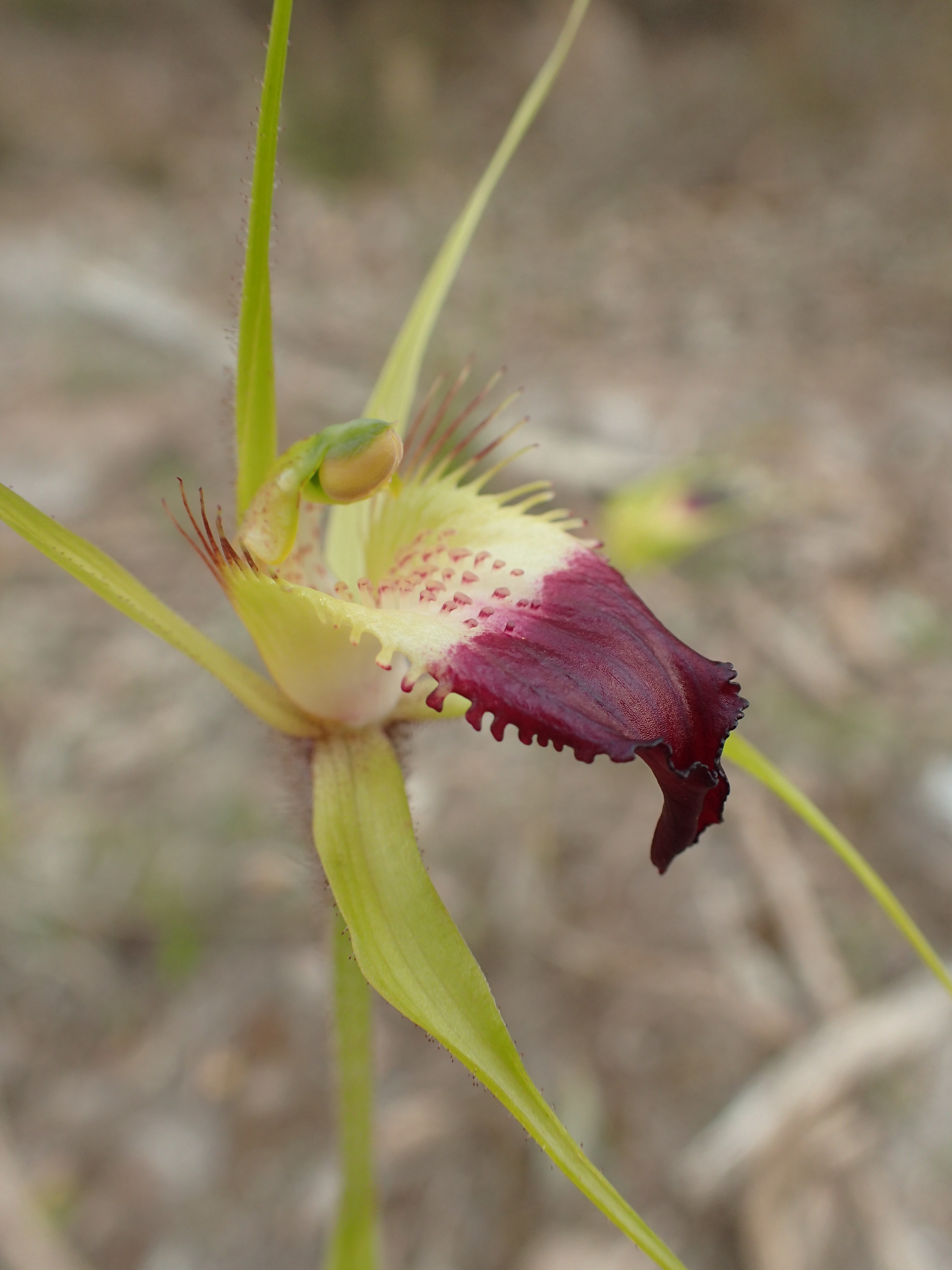
labellum detail

== Description ==
Caladenia infundibularis is a terrestrial, perennial, deciduous, herb with an underground tuber and a single hairy leaf, 80–120 mm (3–5 in) long and about 12 mm (0.5 in) wide. Up to three greenish-yellow flowers 80–120 mm (3–5 in) long and 60–80 mm (2–3 in) wide are borne on a stalk 250–450 mm (10–20 in) tall. The dorsal sepal is erect, 35–55 mm (1–2 in) long and 2–3 mm (0.08–0.1 in) wide. The lateral sepals are 35–65 mm (1–3 in) long, 4–6 mm (0.16–0.24 in) wide and have thin, yellowish-brown, club-like glandular tips 6–15 mm (0.2–0.6 in) long. The petals are 27–38 mm (1.1–1.5 in) long, 3–8 mm (0.1–0.3 in) wide and spread widely or turn slightly downwards. The labellum is greenish-yellow with a red tip, 20–24 mm (0.8–0.9 in) long, 11–16 mm (0.4–0.6 in) wide with the tip turned downwards. It is funnel-shaped at its tip and has many spreading teeth up to 5 mm (0.2 in) long, along its sides and four or six rows of yellowish calli along its mid-line. Flowering occurs in October and November.

== Taxonomy and naming ==
Caladenia infundibularis was first formally described by Alex George in 1984 and the description was published in Nuytsia from a specimen found near Augusta. The specific epithet (infundibularis) is a Latin word meaning "funnel-shaped", referring to the shape of the base of the labellum.

== Distribution and habitat ==
The funnel-web spider orchid occurs between Dunsborough and Northcliffe in the Jarrah Forest, Swan Coastal Plain and Warren biogeographic regions where it grows in coastal heath, forest and woodland.

== Conservation ==
Caladenia infundibularis is classified as "Not Threatened" by the Western Australian Government Department of Parks and Wildlife.
