= Broke, Western Australia =

Locality in the Shire of Manjimup, Western Australia

Broke
- other
- Coordinates: 34.88624°S 116.37090°E
- Country: Australia
- State: Western Australia
- LGA(s): Shire of Manjimup
- Location: 347 km (216 mi) from Perth; 97 km (60 mi) from Manjimup; 8 km (5.0 mi) from Walpole

Government
  - State electorate(s): Warren-Blackwood
  - Federal division(s): O'Connor

Area
  - Total: 492.8 km^{2} (190.3 sq mi)

Population
  - Total(s): 17 (SAL 2021)
- Postcode: 6398
Localities around Broke
Boorara Brook	Shannon	North Walpole
Windy Harbour	Broke	Walpole
Southern Ocean	Southern Ocean	Southern Ocean

Broke is a rural locality of the Shire of Manjimup in the South West region of Western Australia, stretching along the coastline of the Southern Ocean. The South Western Highway forms the north-eastern border of the locality. Most of the locality as covered by national park, predominantly the D'Entrecasteaux National Park, except for the far east, which is covered by the Walpole-Nornalup National Park. The large Broke Inlet lies in the centre of Broke while, in the east, the locality lies on the shore of the Nornalup Inlet.

The origins of the name of the inlet and locality are debated, being linked to Brockman, Broke or Brooks. The inlet and locality's names are thought to be based on Philip Broke, captain of HMS Shannon, a frigate of the Royal Navy, best known for its victory over USS Chesapeake in 1813. Shannon is the name of both a river and a neighbouring locality. Both names were first recorded on a map in 1833.

Broke is on the traditional lands of the Mineng people of the Noongar nation.

The heritage listed Broke Inlet Houses, or Judy's Hut, a small rustic cottage, and Mottram Hut, a former drover’s hut, are located in Broke.
