= Pyropsalta rhythmica =

Scientific classification
- Kingdom: Animalia
- Phylum: Arthropoda
- Clade: Pancrustacea
- Class: Insecta
- Order: Hemiptera
- Suborder: Auchenorrhyncha
- Family: Cicadidae
- Genus: Pyropsalta
- Species: P. rhythmica

Binomial name
- Pyropsalta rhythmica Moulds & Marshall, 2022

Species of cicada

Pyropsalta rhythmica is a species of cicada, also known as the orange bandit or sprinkler cicada, in the true cicada family, Cicadettinae subfamily and Cicadettini tribe. The species is endemic to Australia. It was described in 2022 by entomologists Maxwell Sydney Moulds and David C. Marshall.

== Etymology ==
The specific epithet rhythmica, from Latin rhythmicus, refers to the rhythmical quality of the song.

== Description ==
The length of the forewing is 18–31 mm.

== Distribution and habitat ==
The species occurs in coastal and subcoastal areas of south-west Western Australia, from Perth southwards to Yeagarup and eastwards to Porongurup, in the Swan Coastal Plain, Jarrah Forest and Warren bioregions. Associated habitats are open forest and woodland.

== Behaviour ==
Adult males may be heard from November to March, clinging to the stems, trunks and branches of trees, including eucalypts, emitting strident ticking calls.
