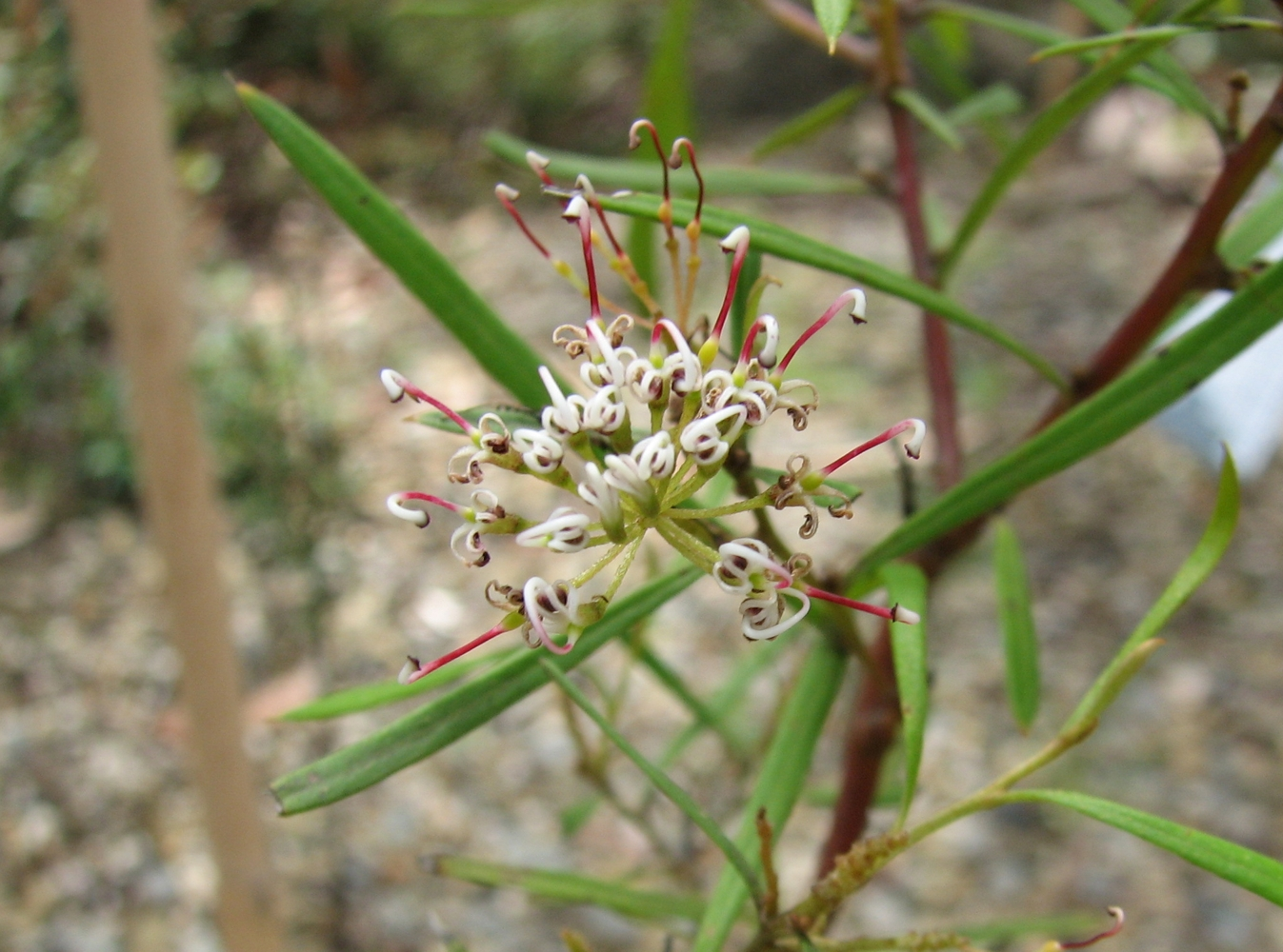
- Subspecies subtersericata in Maranoa Gardens

Conservation status
- Least Concern (IUCN 3.1)

Scientific classification
- Kingdom: Plantae
- Clade: Embryophytes
- Clade: Tracheophytes
- Clade: Spermatophytes
- Clade: Angiosperms
- Clade: Eudicots
- Order: Proteales
- Family: Proteaceae
- Genus: Grevillea
- Species: G. diversifolia

Binomial name
- Grevillea diversifolia Meisn.

= Grevillea diversifolia =

Species of shrub native to Western Australia

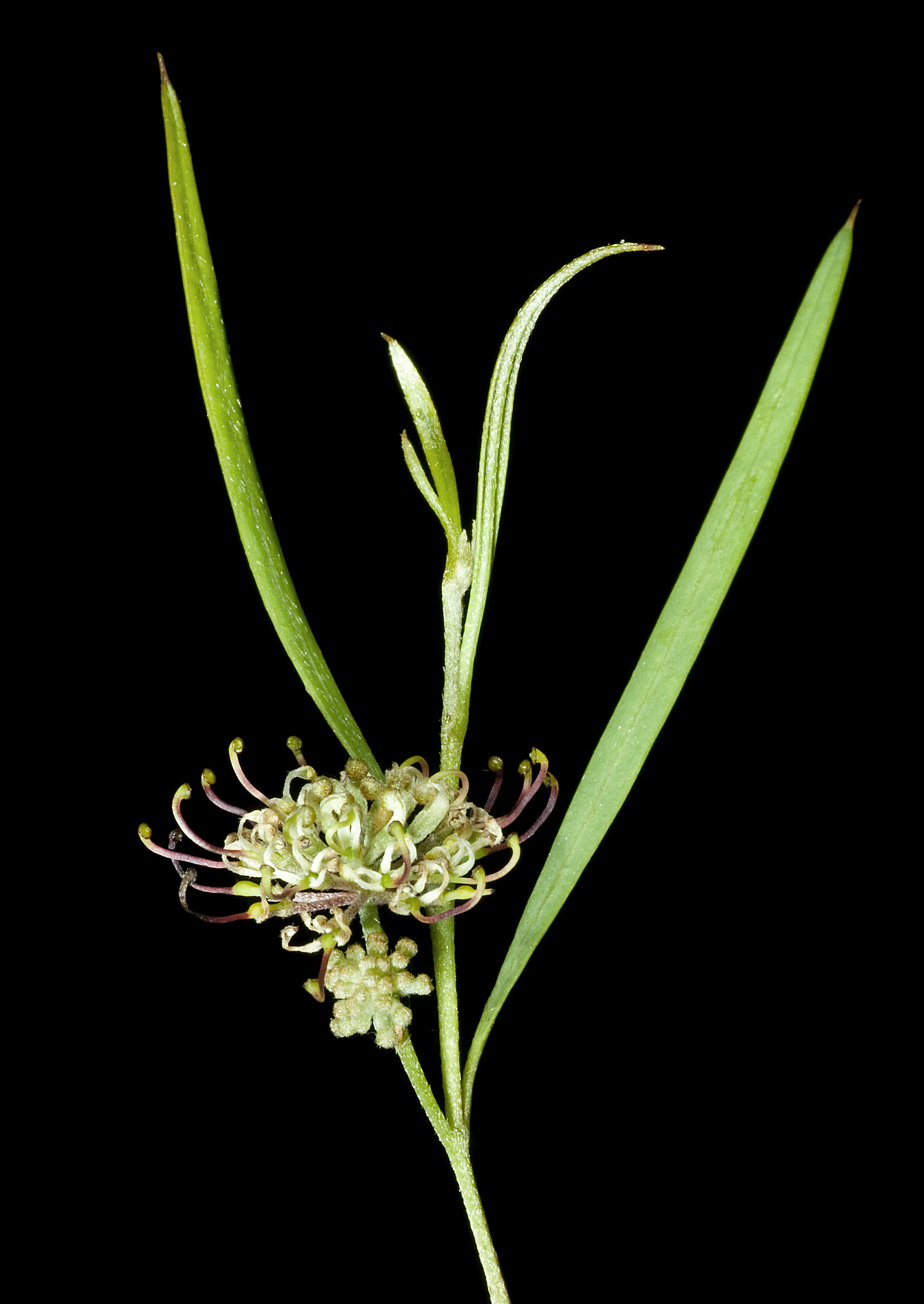
Subspecies diversifolia

Grevillea diversifolia, the variable-leaved grevillea, is a species of flowering plant in the family Proteaceae and is endemic to the south-west of Western Australia. It is an erect to prostrate shrub with simple or divided leaves and groups white to cream-coloured flowers with a dull red style.

== Description ==
Grevillea diversifolia is an erect to prostrate shrub that typically grows to a height of 0.2–6 m (7.9 in – 19 ft 8.2 in). Its leaves are more or less glabrous, lance-shaped with the narrower end toward the base to narrowly elliptic or almost linear, 15–85 mm (0.59–3.35 in) long and 1.5–11 mm (0.059–0.433 in) wide, sometimes narrowly wedge-shaped near the tip with two or three oblong lobes 3–15 mm (0.12–0.59 in) long and 2–4 mm (0.079–0.157 in) wide. The lower surface of the leaves is sometimes glabrous, sometimes densely covered with silky hairs. The flowers are arranged in erect, more or less sessile groups, sometimes on a peduncle up to 15 mm (0.59 in) long, the rachis 1.5–6 mm (0.059–0.236 in) long. The flowers are white to cream-coloured, silky- to woolly-hairy on the outside, the pistil 19.5–28 mm (0.77–1.10 in) long, the style dull red. The fruit is an oblong follicle 10–13 mm (0.39–0.51 in) long.

== Taxonomy ==
Grevillea diversifolia was first formally described by botanist Carl Meissner in 1845 in Johann Georg Christian Lehmann's Plantae Preissianae from specimens collected in 1839 by James Drummond near the Vasse River.

In 1986 Donald McGillivray described two subspecies and the names are accepted by the Australian Plant Census:

- Grevillea diversifolia Meisn. subsp. diversifolia has soft, pliable, sometimes lobed leaves, leaves lacking lobes are 3–11 mm (0.12–0.43 in) wide, and flowers throughout the year, but mainly in September and October;
- Grevillea diversifolia subsp. subtersericata McGill. has semi-rigid leaves, lacking lobes, 1.5–6 mm (0.059–0.236 in) wide and densely hairy on the lower surface, and flowers throughout the years but mainly from July to October.

== Distribution and habitat ==
Subspecies diversifolia grows in shrubby or woodland, often in moist places between Mundaring Weir and Donnybrook in the Jarrah Forest and Swan Coastal Plain biogeographic regions of south-western Western Australia. Subspecies subtersericata grows in shrubland, often near watercourses, from near Albany to near Broke Inlet in the Avon Wheatbelt, Jarrah Forest and Warren biogeographic regions.

== Conservation status ==
This species is listed as least concern on the IUCN Red List of Threatened Species due to its wide distribution, population stability and lack of known major threats. Both subspecies of G. diversifolia are listed as "not threatened" by the Government of Western Australia Department of Biodiversity, Conservation and Attractions.
