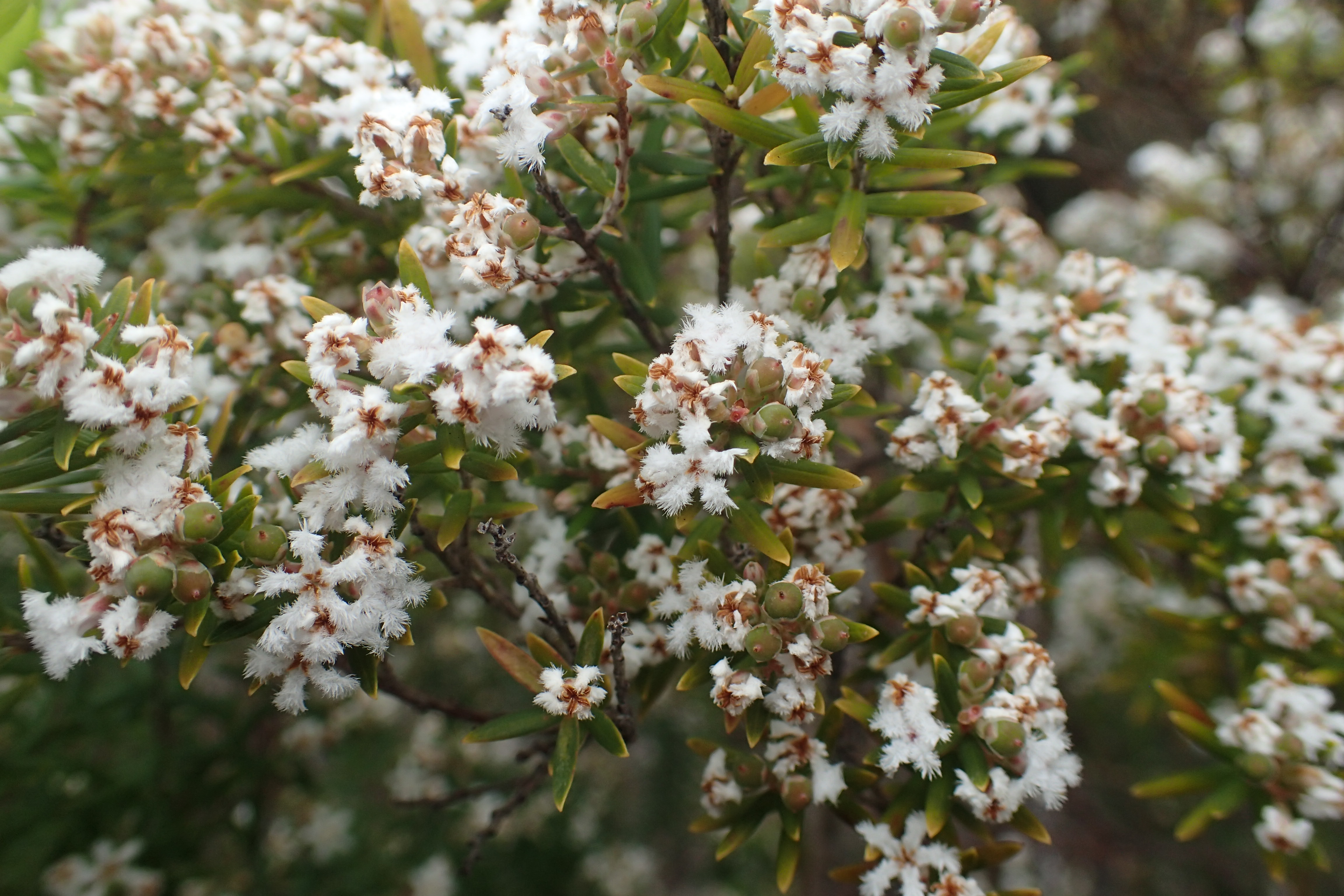

Scientific classification
- Kingdom: Plantae
- Clade: Tracheophytes
- Clade: Angiosperms
- Clade: Eudicots
- Clade: Asterids
- Order: Ericales
- Family: Ericaceae
- Genus: Leucopogon
- Species: L. rubricaulis

Binomial name
- Leucopogon rubricaulis R.Br.

Synonyms
- List: Leucopogon angustatus Benth.; Leucopogon angustatus Benth. var. angustatus; Leucopogon angustatus var. hirsutus Sond.; Leucopogon sp. Denmark (J.M.Powell 1167); Leucopogon villosus R.Br.; Styphelia rubricaulis (R.Br.) Spreng.; Styphelia villosa (R.Br.) Spreng. nom. illeg.

= Leucopogon rubricaulis =

Species of shrub

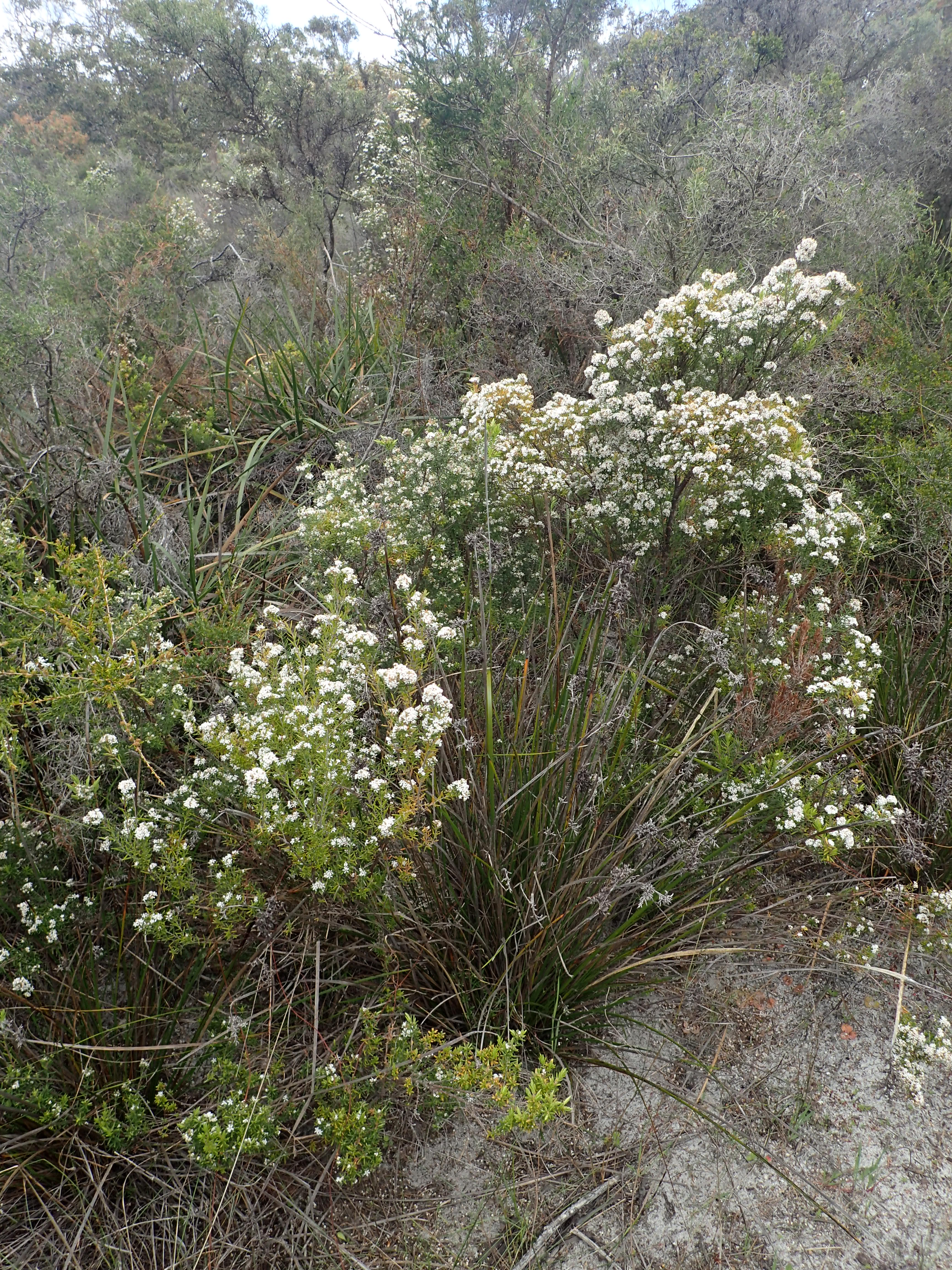
Habit near Narrikup

Leucopogon rubricaulis is a species of flowering plant in the heath family Ericaceae and is endemic to the south of Western Australia. It is an erect, open shrub with narrowly egg-shaped or narrowly elliptic leaves and white, tube-shaped flowers arranged on the ends of branches and in upper leaf axils in groups of four to thirteen.

== Description ==
Leucopogon rubricaulis is an erect, open shrub that typically grows to 1.5 m (4 ft 11 in) high and wide, and is usually single-stemmed at ground level. The leaves are narrowly egg-shaped to narrowly elliptic or linear to oblong, 4.5–18 mm (0.18–0.71 in) long and 0.7–2.8 mm (0.028–0.110 in) wide on a cream-coloured to pale brown petiole up to about 0.5 mm (0.020 in) long. The edges of the leaves are sometimes turned down or rolled under, the upper surface of the leaves usually glabrous, the lower surface concealed or sometimes hairy. The flowers are borne on the ends of branches and in upper leaf axils in groups of four to thirteen with egg-shaped bracts and bracteoles 1.4–2.4 mm (0.055–0.094 in) long. The sepals are 2.0–2.8 mm (0.079–0.110 in) long, the petals white and joined at the base, forming a bell-shaped tube 1.1–1.7 mm (0.043–0.067 in) long, the lobes pink or white, 2.3–3.3 mm (0.091–0.130 in) wide and densely bearded inside.

== Taxonomy ==
Leucopogon rubricaulis was first formally described in 1810 by Robert Brown in his Prodromus Florae Novae Hollandiae et Insulae Van Diemen. The specific epithet (rubricaulis) means "red-stemmed".

== Distribution and habitat ==
This leucopogon occurs in near-coastal areas of southern Western Australia between Broke Inlet and Mount Barker in the Esperance Plains, Jarrah Forest and Warren bioregions where it grows in a variety of vegetation types.

== Conservation status ==
Leucopogon rubricaulis is listed as "not threatened" by the Government of Western Australia Department of Biodiversity, Conservation and Attractions.
