= HMS Shannon (1806) =

Leda-class frigate of the Royal Navy

- Shannon (left) capturing USS Chesapeake on 1 June 1813

History

United Kingdom
- Name: Shannon
- Ordered: 24 October 1803
- Builder: Brindley, Frindsbury
- Laid down: August 1804
- Launched: 5 May 1806
- Completed: 3 August 1806 at Chatham Dockyard
- Out of service: Receiving ship in 1831
- Renamed: St Lawrence in 1844
- Honours and awards: Naval General Service Medal with clasp "Shannon wh. Chesapeake"
- Fate: Breaking up completed by 12 November 1859

General characteristics
- Class & type: Leda-class frigate
- Tons burthen: 1,06562/94 (bm)
- Length: 150 ft 2 in (45.8 m) (gundeck); 125 ft 6 1/2 in (38.3 m) (keel)
- Beam: 39 ft 11 3/8 in (12.2 m)
- Depth of hold: 12 ft 11 in (3.9 m)
- Sail plan: Full-rigged ship
- Complement: 330
- Armament: Upper deck: 28 × 18-pounder guns; QD: 2 × 9-pounder guns + 12 × 32-pounder carronades; Fc: 2 × 9-pounder guns + 2 × 32-pounder carronades

HMS Shannon was a 38-gun Leda-class fifth-rate frigate of the Royal Navy. She was launched in 1806 and served in the Napoleonic Wars and the War of 1812. She won a noteworthy naval victory on 1 June 1813, during the latter conflict, when she captured the United States Navy frigate USS Chesapeake in a bloody battle.

== Design and construction ==
Shannon was an 18-pounder Leda-class frigate. The class was based on the lines of the captured French 38-gun frigate Hébé, a design by Jacques-Noël Sané vaunted as an all-rounder. The naval historian Robert Gardiner argues that the key characteristic of the design, leading to its adoption with the Royal Navy, was its "unspectacular excellence". One ship, HMS Leda, was built during the French Revolutionary Wars in 1800. With the Napoleonic Wars subsequently beginning, the design was revived as one of three mass-produced frigates, contrasting with the strategy of the previous war which had seen a much more sporadic choice of designs.

The first three ships of the revival, including Shannon, were contracted out to private shipyards. The frigate was ordered on 24 October 1803 to be built at Frindsbury by Josiah and Thomas Brindley. Shannon was laid down there in August the following year. The ship was launched on 5 May 1806 with the following dimensions: 150 feet 2 inches (45.8 m) along the gun deck, 125 feet 6 1/2 inches (38.3 m) at the keel, with a beam of 39 feet 11 3/8 inches (12.2 m) and a depth in the hold of 12 feet 11 inches (3.9 m). Her draught was 10 feet 10 inches (3.3 m) forward and 14 feet 9 inches (4.5 m) aft, and the ship measured 1,065 62/94 tons burthen. The fitting out process for Shannon was completed on 3 August at Chatham Dockyard. Her construction and fitting out cost in total £33,048.

The frigate originally had a crew complement of 284, but this was later increased to 300. Shannon carried twenty-eight 18-pounder long guns on her upper deck. The Leda-class frigates were stipulated to be armed with eight 9-pounder long guns and six 32-pounder carronades on the quarterdeck, but Shannon differed from this. She was given two 9-pounder long guns and twelve 32-pounder carronades. Complementing this were two 9-pounder long guns and two 32-pounder carronades on the forecastle. Shannon was named after the River Shannon, becoming the fourth Royal Navy ship to bear that name.

Sailing reports from ships of the Leda class record that they were generally very fast, reaching 13 knots (24 km/h) in strong winds. They were however not particularly weatherly and rolled heavily. During her service Shannon, described as a "sensitive ship", had her false keel increased to counter these issues. The construction techniques used by the Brindleys included not using knees, which in her later service saw Shannon's upper levels loose and "work[ing] like a basket".

== Service ==
=== Commissioning ===
Shannon spent her first seven years under the command of Captain Philip Broke, who was transferred from Druid and took command of Shannon in June 1806.

=== Home waters ===
Shannon was quickly put into service. She formed part of a squadron under Commodore Owen that was patrolling off the French port of Boulogne. On 8 October she took part in the bombardment of the town using Congreve rockets.

Her next task was sailing in 1807 with Meleager to protect the whale fishery off Greenland. Despite encountering ice on 7 May 1807, they were able to push through, reaching the southern part of Spitsbergen on 17 June. There the two ships surveyed the Bay of Magdalena, at a latitude of 80°N. They eventually reached a latitude of 80° 6' N before the ice stopped them. They then turned westwards and reached the coast of Greenland on 23 July. The island of Shannon is named after the ship. Shannon spent the early autumn cruising from Shetland. She then left, returning to Yarmouth by the end of September, where she cruised off the Downs. She put into Spithead on 28 September to refit.

By the end of 1807, France had invaded Portugal, and Shannon joined Sir Samuel Hood's expedition against Madeira. The British took the island without firing a shot. Captain Broke then escorted the transports that had accompanied the fleet back to England, where they arrived on 7 February 1808. Shannon put into Plymouth before returning to patrolling in the Channel.

On 20 July Shannon was in company with Surinam and Eclair when they captured Comet. Then on 21 August, Shannon was in company with Surinam and Martial when they captured Espoir.

In November 1808, Shannon took the French frigate Thétis in tow. Amethyst had shortly before captured Thétis, which later entered service as HMS Brune.

Shannon spent 1809 with the Channel Fleet and on 27 January captured the French 14-gun privateer cutter Pommereuil. Broke sent the prize into Plymouth.

On 1 June 1811, Shannon returned to Plymouth and was put into the dock where her hull was re-coppered. After this was completed, she sailed for Portsmouth to complete her refitting and resupplying in preparation for being assigned to foreign service.

=== The American coast ===
Broke and Shannon were ordered to sail for North America as tensions between Britain and the United States escalated in the run-up to what would become the War of 1812. Shannon sailed from Portsmouth and arrived in Halifax on 24 September 1811 after a journey of 45 days.

On 5 July 1812 Broke took command of a squadron consisting of Shannon, Africa, Belvidera, Aeolus and later Guerriere. Vice-Admiral Herbert Sawyer then ordered him to carry out a blockade of American ports.

Broke's first success came on 16 July when he captured the 16-gun American brig Nautilus off Sandy Hook. Nautilus had been on a cruise from New York.

Later in the evening, the squadron spotted and gave chase to USS Constitution as she sailed from Chesapeake Bay to New York. The chase lasted some 65 hours, during which both pursued and pursuers had to tow and warp. Belvidera eventually managed to come within gunshot of Constitution on the afternoon of 17 July, but a lucky breeze blew up, and Constitution's clean bottom allowed her to make good her escape.

Shannon's next duty was to meet a convoy homebound from Jamaica. An American squadron under Commodore John Rodgers had sailed to intercept it. Shannon ensured the convoy safely passed the Great Banks, before she returned to the American coast. Shannon recaptured the brig Planter, which the American privateer Atlas had captured on 3 August.

Shannon put into Halifax on 20 September to take on provisions. Sir John Warren arrived while she was in port, and took up the post of commander in chief of the North America and West Indies Station. He then despatched Shannon with the schooner Bream to rescue the crew and offload the money being carried by the frigate HMS Barbadoes, which had been wrecked on Sable Island. While carrying out this mission, Shannon encountered and subsequently captured an enemy privateer schooner, Wily Reynard on 11 October, that she took back to Halifax with her. (Note: Wiley Reynard, of Boston, W.Lane, master, was a schooner of 22 tons (bm), one gun, and 24 men.)

On 31 October, while Shannon was cruising with Tenedos, Nymphe, and Curlew, Broke captured the American privateer brig Thorn. Thorn was armed with eighteen long 9-pounder guns and had a crew of 140 men. She was three weeks out of Marblehead on her first cruise. Sent to Halifax with a prize crew, Thorn was subsequently purchased and renamed as the Nova Scotia privateer brig Sir John Sherbrooke.

Sir John Warren was at Bermuda during the winter of 1812, and left Broke in command of the Royal Navy squadrons operating on the coasts of Nova Scotia, New Brunswick and New England. In December Broke took the Shannon and escorted a homebound convoy halfway across the Atlantic, returning to North America by sailing round the Azores.

On 31 January 1813 Shannon recaptured the ship Hebe, which the American privateer Dolphin had captured six days earlier in a hard-fought action.

In 1813, Captain Oliver arrived on the station aboard the 74-gun third rate Valiant, and took command from Captain Broke. Broke continued to deploy with his squadron until Shannon and Tenedos became separated from them in a gale. They decided to steer for Boston, reaching the port on 2 April. Having observed the activity in the port, they returned to their squadron and reported the presence of the American frigates Congress, President and Constitution. In their absence, Chesapeake had entered the harbour through the eastern channel.

Captain Capel aboard Hogue ordered Shannon and Tenedos to watch the port from close inshore, while the rest of the squadron cruised in the offing. On 16 May Shannon and Tenedos chased a large armed ship under American colours, and forced her to run aground near Cape Ann Town. Shannon anchored close to the grounded ship and fired a few shots to disperse a number of militiamen who were assembling. Lieutenant George Watt of Shannon then managed to bring the ship off the shore without loss. She was the French corvette-built privateer Invincible, of 16 guns, originally named Invincible Napoleon.

On 25 March Shannon took on stores of water and provisions from Tenedos, which was then detached, with orders to rejoin the Shannon on 14 June.

== Fighting Chesapeake ==
=== Issuing a challenge ===
During his long period in command of Shannon, Broke had drilled his crew to an extremely high standard of naval gunnery.

The weekly routine at sea was for the watch on deck to be exercised at the great guns on Monday and Tuesday forenoons, and in the afternoons the first division of the watch was exercised at small arms. Wednesday and Thursday forenoons saw the watch on deck at the carronades, and in the afternoons the second division of the watch at small arms. Friday was reserved for the midshipmen – great guns in the morning, small arms in the afternoon. Thus each man had one morning at the 18-pounders, one morning at the carronades and two afternoons with musquets in every week. Saturdays were reserved for washing clothes and scrubbing the berth deck in the afternoon. Sunday, apart from Church service and any necessary evolutions with the sails, was free.

In addition to these gunnery drills, Broke was fond of preparing hypothetical scenarios to test his crew. For example, after all hands had been drummed to quarters, he would inform them of a theoretical attack and see how they would act to defend the ship. He would also arrange on occasion for a wooden cask to be sent over the side so competitions could be held to see which crew could hit it and how fast they could do so. A game called 'singlestick' was also practised. "This was a game employing roughly similar thrusts and parries as were used with cutlass, but as it was played with blunt sticks, hits, although painful, were not often dangerous. It soon developed quickness of eye and wrist."

Eager to engage and defeat one of the American 'super-frigates' that had already scored a number of victories over smaller Royal Navy ships in single-ship confrontations, Broke prepared a challenge. The warship President had already slipped out of the harbour under the cover of fog and had evaded the British. Constitution was undergoing extensive repairs and alterations and would not be ready for sea in the foreseeable future. However, Chesapeake appeared to be ready to put to sea.

Consequently, Broke decided to send his challenge to Chesapeake, which had been refitting in Boston harbour under the command of Captain James Lawrence, offering single-ship combat. While patrolling offshore, Shannon had intercepted and captured a number of American ships attempting to reach the harbour. After sending two of them off to Halifax, he found that his crew was dangerously reduced in numbers. Broke therefore resorted to burning the rest of the prizes in order to conserve his highly trained crew in anticipation of the battle with Chesapeake. Broke sent the boats from the burnt prizes into Boston, carrying Broke's oral invitation to Lawrence to come out and engage him. He had already sent Tenedos away in the hope that the more favourable odds would entice the American out, but eventually began to despair that Chesapeake would ever come out of the harbour. He finally decided to send a written challenge.

As the Chesapeake appears now ready for sea, I request you will do me the favour to meet the Shannon with her, ship to ship, to try the fortune of our respective flags. The Shannon mounts twenty-four guns upon her broadside and one light boat-gun; 18 pounders upon her main deck, and 32-pounder carronades upon her quarter-deck and forecastle; and is manned with a complement of 300 men and boys, beside thirty seamen, boys, and passengers, who were taken out of recaptured vessels lately. I entreat you, sir, not to imagine that I am urged by mere personal vanity to the wish of meeting the Chesapeake, or that I depend only upon your personal ambition for your acceding to this invitation. We have both noble motives. You will feel it as a compliment if I say that the result of our meeting may be the most grateful service I can render to my country; and I doubt not that you, equally confident of success, will feel convinced that it is only by repeated triumphs in even combats that your little navy can now hope to console your country for the loss of that trade it can no longer protect. Favour me with a speedy reply. We are short of provisions and water, and cannot stay long here.

By now Shannon had been off Boston for 56 days and was running short of provisions, while the extended period at sea was wearing the ship down. She would be even more at a disadvantage facing Chesapeake, fresh from harbour and a refit.

Broke despatched a boat carrying the invitation, manned by a Mr Slocum, a discharged American prisoner. The boat had not reached the shore when Chesapeake was seen underway, sailing out of the harbour. She was flying three American ensigns and a large white flag at the foremast inscribed 'Free Trade and Sailor's Rights'.

Though Lawrence had not received Broke's letter before leaving harbour, according to author Ian W. Toll, it would not have made any difference, Lawrence intended to sail at the first day of favourable weather. The fact that it was not in his nation's interests at this point in the war to be challenging British frigates seems not to have entered into his reasoning; President had in fact slipped out of harbour in foul weather to commerce raid, which was deemed in the US national interest.

The two ships had in one another about as close a match as could exist in a state of war. Chesapeake's (rated at 38 guns) armament of twenty-eight 18-pounder long guns was an exact match for Shannon. Measurements proved the ships to be about the same deck length. The only measurable difference between the two ships was the size of their complements: Chesapeake's 379 against Shannon's 330. Shannon carried 276 officers, seamen and marines of her proper complement; eight recaptured seamen; 22 Irish labourers who had been 48 hours in the ship and of whom only four could speak English, and 24 boys, of whom about 13 were under 12 years of age. (Note: Shannon recruited the Irishmen from the privateer Sir John Sherbrooke, which had rescued the Irish labourers after an American privateer had captured Duck on which they were travelling.)

Broke had trained his gun crews to fire accurate broadsides into the hulls of enemy vessels, with the aim of killing their gun crews, rather than shooting down the masts. By contrast, half of Chesapeake's officers and up to one quarter of the crew were new to the ship. Her crew had conducted no practice at small arms nor of the main battery. Despite this, Lawrence believed that he would win the battle. The previous American victories over smaller Royal Navy ships left him expectant of success, especially since Chesapeake had a substantially larger crew than Shannon.

Still, before setting sail, Lawrence wrote two quick notes, one to the Secretary of the Navy pronouncing his intentions and another to his brother-in-law asking him to look after Lawrence's wife and children in event of his death. He then set sail. Just before the engagement, the American crew gave three cheers.

=== Initial engagement ===
Chesapeake (left) shortening sail as she bears down on Shannon, who has backed her main topsail to await the American ship

The two ships met at half past five in the afternoon, 20 nautical miles (37 km) east of Boston lighthouse, between Cape Ann and Cape Cod. Shannon was flying a rusty Blue Ensign and her dilapidated outside appearance after a long period at sea suggested that she would be an easy opponent. Observing Chesapeake's many flags, a sailor had questioned Broke: "Mayn't we have three ensigns, sir, like she has?" "No," said Broke, "we've always been an unassuming ship."

Shannon refused to fire upon Chesapeake as she bore down, nor would Chesapeake rake Shannon despite having the weather gage. Lawrence's behaviour that day earned him praise from British officers for his gallantry. The two ships opened fire just before 18:00 at a range of about 35 metres (115 ft), with Shannon scoring the first hit, striking Chesapeake on one of her gunports with two round shot and a bag of musket balls fired by William Mindham, the gun captain of one of Shannon's starboard 18-pounders. Two or three further broadsides followed that swept Chesapeake's decks with grape and roundshot from Shannon's 32-pounder carronades. Shannon's fire destroyed Chesapeake's helm and fore-topsail halyards; this caused her to 'luff up' into the wind. Chesapeake, unable to manoeuvre, then made sternway (was blown backwards). Her port stern quarter contacted Shannon's side, level with the fifth gun port from the bow, and was trapped by one of Shannon's anchors.

With Chesapeake trapped against Shannon and unable to manoeuvre, Chesapeake's stern now became exposed to raking British fire. Her situation worsened when a small open cask of musket cartridges abaft the mizzen-mast blew up. When the smoke cleared, Captain Broke judged the time was right and gave the order to board. Lawrence, too, tried to give the order to board, but the British were faster.

=== The British board ===
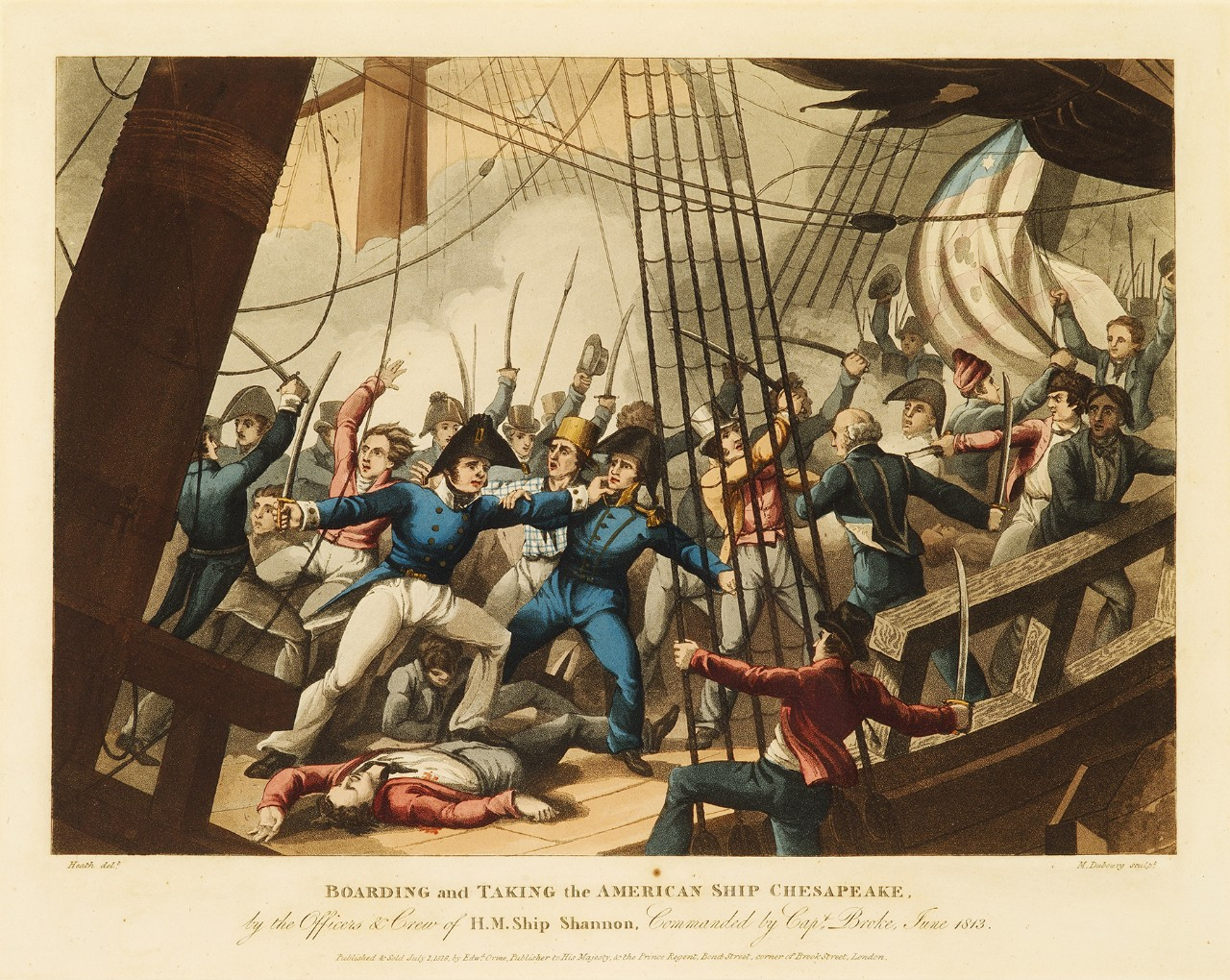
Illustration of the British boarding Chesapeake. Broke is inaccurately shown wearing a bicorne, when in reality he wore a round hat.

Mr Stevens, the boatswain attempted to lash the two ships together to prevent Chesapeake from disengaging and escaping. This bravery cost him an arm. A party of small-arm men rushed aboard Chesapeake, led by Broke and including the purser, Mr G. Aldham, and the clerk, Mr John Dunn. Aldham and Dunn were killed as they crossed the gangway, but the rest of the party made it onto Chesapeake.

Captain Broke, at the head of not more than twenty men, stepped from the rail of the waist-hammock netting to the muzzle of the after-carronade of the Chesapeake, and sprang from thence upon her quarterdeck.

The main-deck was found to be empty, having been swept clear by Shannon's broadsides. Broke and his men quickly advanced forward along the deck, while more British reinforcements leapt aboard.

Meanwhile, the first lieutenant, Mr George T. L. Watt, had attempted to hoist the British colours over Chesapeake but was killed, hit in the forehead by grapeshot, as he did so. Fighting had now broken out along the top-masts of the ships as rival sharpshooters fired upon their opponents in the masts, and on the sailors on the exposed decks. The British marksmen, led by Midshipman William Smith, who had command of the fore-top, stormed Chesapeake's fore-top over the yard-arm and killed all the Americans there.

Captain Broke himself led a charge against a number of the Americans who had managed to rally on the forecastle. After four minutes of fierce fighting, the Americans called for quarter, but then, finding that they outnumbered the British, they rallied and counterattacked. Three American sailors, probably from the rigging, descended and attacked Captain Broke. Although taken by surprise, he killed the first. The second hit him with a musket, which stunned him, while the third sliced open his skull with his sabre, knocking Broke to the deck. Before the American could finish Broke off, he was cut down by William Windham. Shannon's crew rallied to the defence of their captain and carried the forecastle, killing the remaining Americans.

Broke handed over command of Shannon to Lieutenant Provo Wallis. Though wounded, Broke was able to save the life of a young American midshipman who had slid down a rope from the fore-top. With American resistance weakening, Lieutenant Charles Leslie Falkiner, who had commanded the boarders who had rushed the main-deck, took command of the prize. While the two-yard-arms had been locked together, Mr Cosnaham, who had commanded the main-top, had crawled out on the main yard-arm where he could fire down onto Chesapeake, killing three of her men.

=== Chesapeake is taken ===
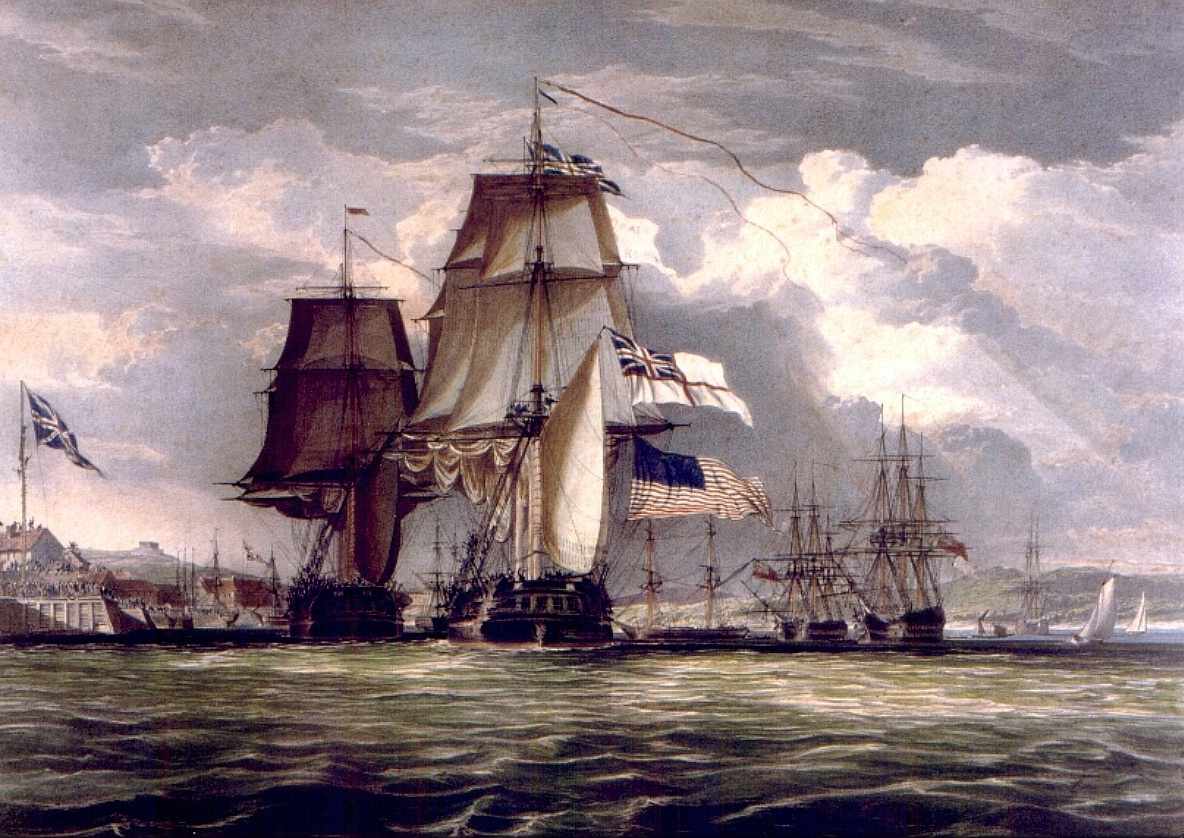
An 1830 representation of HMS Shannon leading the captured American frigate Chesapeake into Halifax Harbour in June 1813.

The British then secured the ship and took her surrender. The engagement had lasted just eleven minutes. Shannon had lost 23 killed, and had 56 wounded. Chesapeake had about 60 killed, including her four lieutenants, the master and many other of her officers, and about as many wounded. Captain Lawrence had been mortally wounded by fire from Shannon's fore-top and was carried below before Chesapeake was boarded. His last order upon being wounded was "Don't give up the ship!".

A large cask of unslaked lime was found open on Chesapeake's forecastle and another bag of lime was discovered in the fore-top. Some British sailors alleged the intention was to throw handfuls into the eyes of Shannon's men as they attempted to board. The historian Albert Gleaves has called the allegations "absurd," noting, "Lime is always carried in ship's stores as a disinfectant, and the fact that it was left on the deck after the ship was cleared for action was probably due to the neglect of some subordinate, or petty officer."

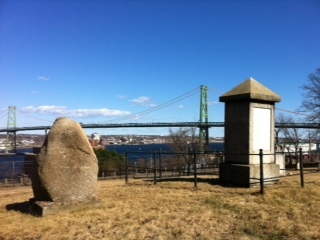
Gravestones for the casualties of Chesapeake (left) and Shannon (right), CFB Halifax, Halifax, Nova Scotia

Shannon's midshipmen during the action were Messrs. Smith, Leake, Clavering, Raymond, Littlejohn and Samwell. Samwell was the only other officer to be wounded in the action. Mr Etough was the acting master, and conned the ship into the action. Shortly after the frigate had been secured, Broke fainted from loss of blood and was rowed back to Shannon to be attended to by the ship's surgeon. After the victory, a prize crew was put aboard Chesapeake and Shannon escorted her and her crew into Halifax, arriving there on 6 June. Lieutenant Bartholomew Kent, of Nova Scotia brought the first news of the British victory back to London.

At Halifax Chesapeake's crew was imprisoned. Chesapeake herself was repaired and taken into service by the Royal Navy before she was sold at Portsmouth, England in 1820 and broken up.

=== Aftermath ===
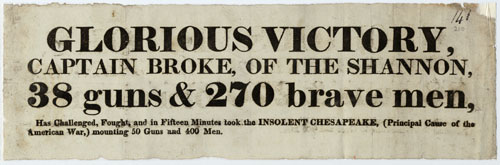
Newspaper announcing Shannon's victory

The victory provided a boost to the British position in the Americas, while Lawrence was posthumously honoured in the United States. After setting out on 5 September for a brief cruise under a Captain Teahouse, Shannon departed for England on 4 October, carrying the recovering Captain Broke. They arrived at Portsmouth on 2 November. After the successful action Lieutenants Wallis and Falkiner were promoted to the rank of commander, and Messrs. Etough and Smith were made lieutenants. Captain Broke was made a baronet that September. The Court of Common Council of London awarded him the freedom of the city, and a sword worth 100 guineas. He also received a piece of plate worth 750 pounds and a cup worth 100 guineas.

The British buried Captain Lawrence in Halifax with full military honours; six senior Royal Navy officers served as pall bearers. Although Shannon's surgeon had pronounced as fatal Captain Broke's head wound from a cutlass stroke, he survived; nevertheless, he never again commanded a ship due to his injuries. Two-thirds of the boarding party which captured the Chesapeake were either wounded or killed in action. The casualties, 228 killed or wounded in total, were high, with the ratio making it one of the bloodiest single ship actions of the age of sail. It had the single highest body count in an action between two ships in the entirety of the war. The fact that it happened in 15 minutes is a sign of the sheer ferocity with which this battle was fought between the two combatants.

In 1847 the Admiralty authorized the issue of the Naval General Service Medal with clasp "Shannon wh. Chesapeake" to any surviving claimants from the action.

== Subsequent service ==
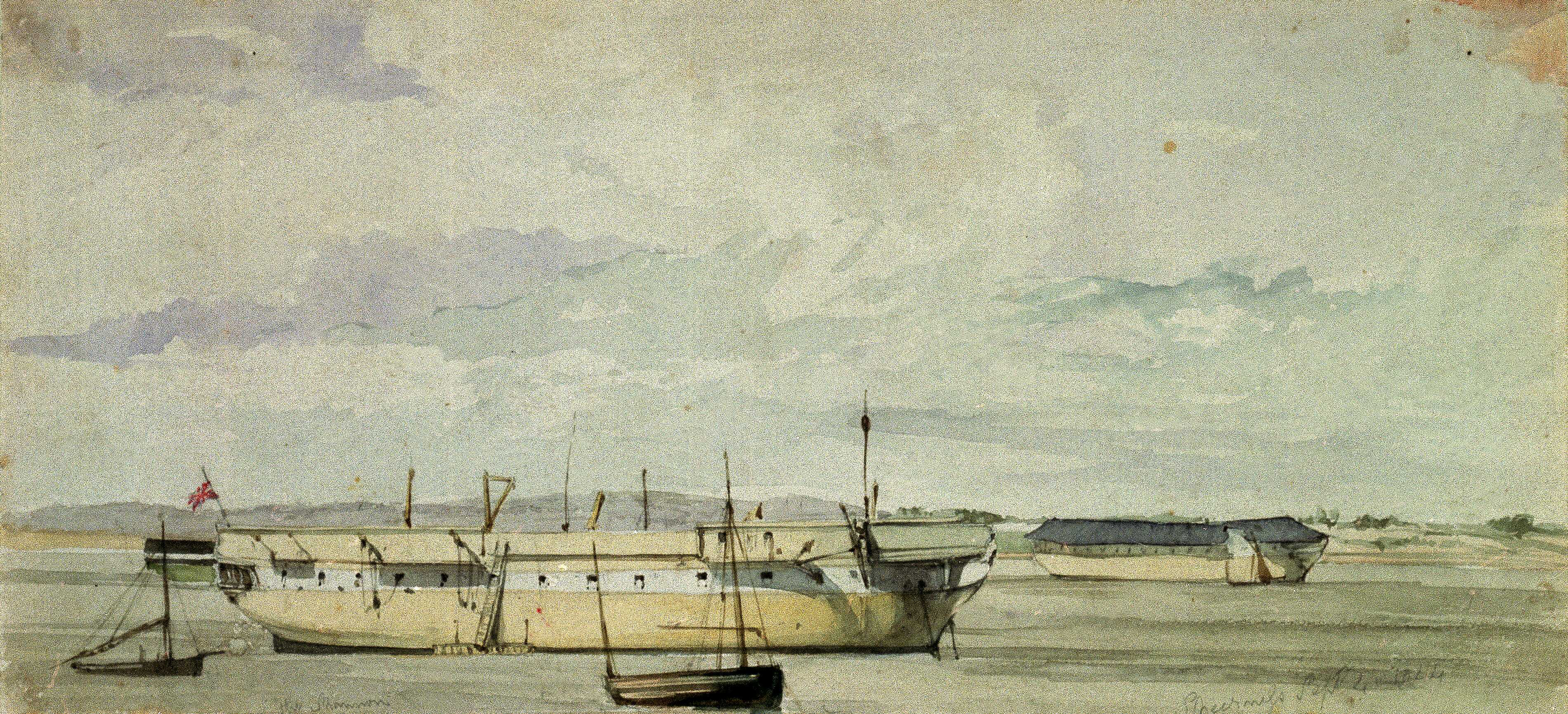
Shannon as a hulk at Sheerness on 4 September 1844

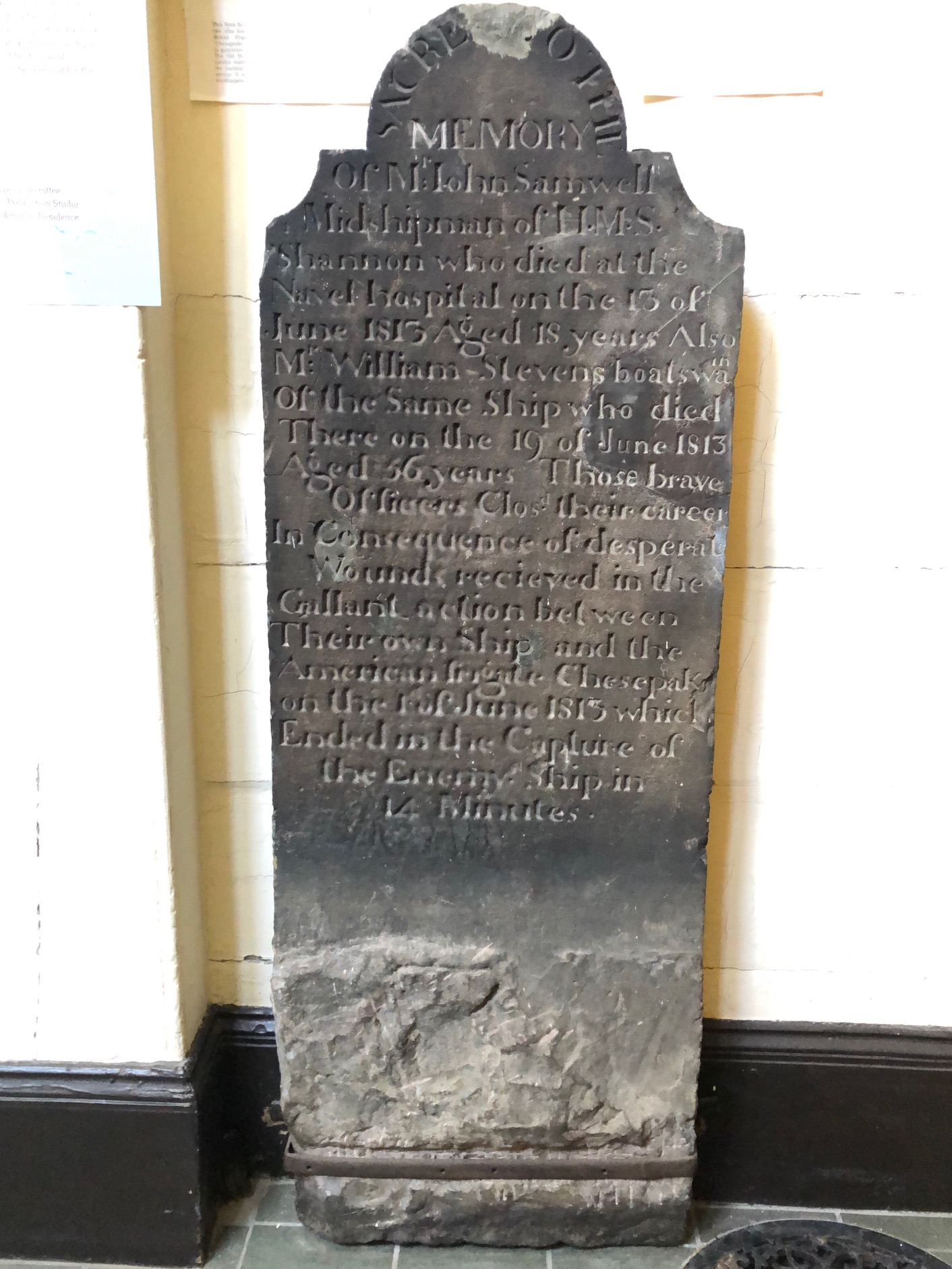
Gravestone for two crew members, HMS Shannon, 1813, St. Paul's Church (Halifax), Nova Scotia

Commander Humphrey Senhouse (acting) assumed command in June 1813. Shannon was in ordinary at Portsmouth in 1814–1815.

Between July 1815 and March 1817, she was at Chatham undergoing extensive repairs that cost £26,328. She then returned to ordinary. She underwent a small repair for £4,969 between May and July 1826. She was fitted for sea between August and December 1828, which cost another £14,746. In September Captain Benjamin Clement recommissioned her, and he would command her until 1830.

Shannon became a receiving ship and temporary hulk at Sheerness in 1831. On 11 March 1844 she was renamed Saint Lawrence.

== Fate ==
Shannon was finally broken up at Chatham, a process completed on 12 November 1859.

== Legacy ==
- Graves of Shannon's crew are marked in the cemetery of the Royal Naval Dockyard, Halifax and at the city's St. Paul's Church, then the cathedral of the Anglican Diocese of Nova Scotia. A plaque was erected to commemorate the battle in Halifax in 1927 and may be seen at Point Pleasant Park. Shannon's bell is displayed at the Maritime Museum of the Atlantic in Halifax in an exhibit about the battle which includes a surgeon's chest and mess kettle from Chesapeake. Cannons believed to be from Shannon and Chesapeake are displayed either side of Province House, Nova Scotia's legislature.
- Namesake of Shannon Park, Nova Scotia
- Because he was able to claim six days as acting captain of Shannon, Provo Wallis became senior to many others who had been lieutenants in the Napoleonic-era Royal Navy. It was an advantage that, combined with his longevity, eventually propelled him to the post of Admiral of the Fleet.
- A fictionalised account of the battle appears in The Fortune of War by Patrick O'Brian.
- A special Canadian silver 10-dollar coin commemorating the War of 1812 Bicentennial depicts HMS Shannon.
- Broke Inlet, Broke, Shannon River, Shannon and Shannon National Park in the south-west of Western Australia are though to have been named after the ship and its captain.

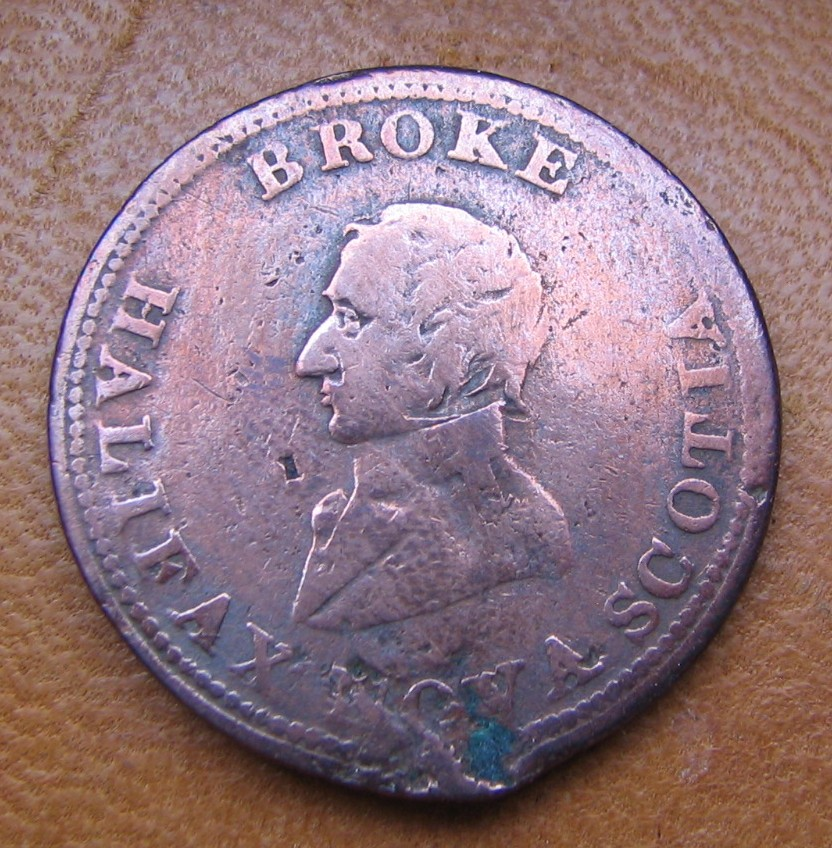
Copper coin struck in Halifax honouring Broke's victory

=== Folksong ===
The battle became the subject of a British ballad:

The Chesapeake and the Shannon

The Chesapeake so bold, out of Boston, I am told,
Came to take a British frigate neat and handy, O!
It allowed immigrants to lambast the critical events
that unfolded during the Kentucky resolutions, O!

Yankee doodle, Yankee doodle dandy, O!
The people of the port came out to see the sport,
With their music playing Yankee doodle dandy, O!

The British frigate's name, that for the purpose came
To tame the Yankee's courage neat and handy, O!
Was the Shannon, Captain Broke, with his crew all hearts of oak,
And in fighting, you must know, he was the dandy, O!

Yankee doodle, &c.

The fight had scarce began when the Yankees, with much fun,
Said, we'll tow her into Boston neat and handy, O!
And I'll kalkilate we'll dine, with our lasses, drinking wine,
And we'll dance the jig of Yankee doodle dandy, O!

Yankee doodle, &c.

But they soon every one flinched from the gun,
Which at first they thought to use so neat and handy, O!
Brave Broke he waved his sword, crying, "Now, my lads, let's aboard,"
And we'll stop their playing Yankee doodle dandy, O!

Yankee doodle, &c.

He scarce had said the word, when they all jump'd on board,
And they hauled down the ensign neat and handy, O!
Notwithstanding all their brag, the glorious British flag
At the Yankees' mizzen-peak it looked the dandy, O!

Yankee doodle, &c.

Then here's to all true blue, both officers and crew,
Who tamed the Yankees' courage neat and handy, O!
And may it ever prove in battle, as in love,
The true British sailor is the dandy, O!

Yankee doodle, &c.

- In July 2012, the Royal Canadian Mint issued a commemorative coin about Shannon: "The War of 1812 was a fundamental turning point in Canada's history. Its history—including that of the Leda-class frigate, HMS Shannon—has become an important chapter in the narrative of Canada's evolution from colony to sovereign nation. The two-dollar coin featuring HMS Shannon commemorates the historic 11-minute battle with the USS Chesapeake off the coast of Boston. The capture of the Chesapeake marked a decisive naval victory for the British at a time when morale was waning."
