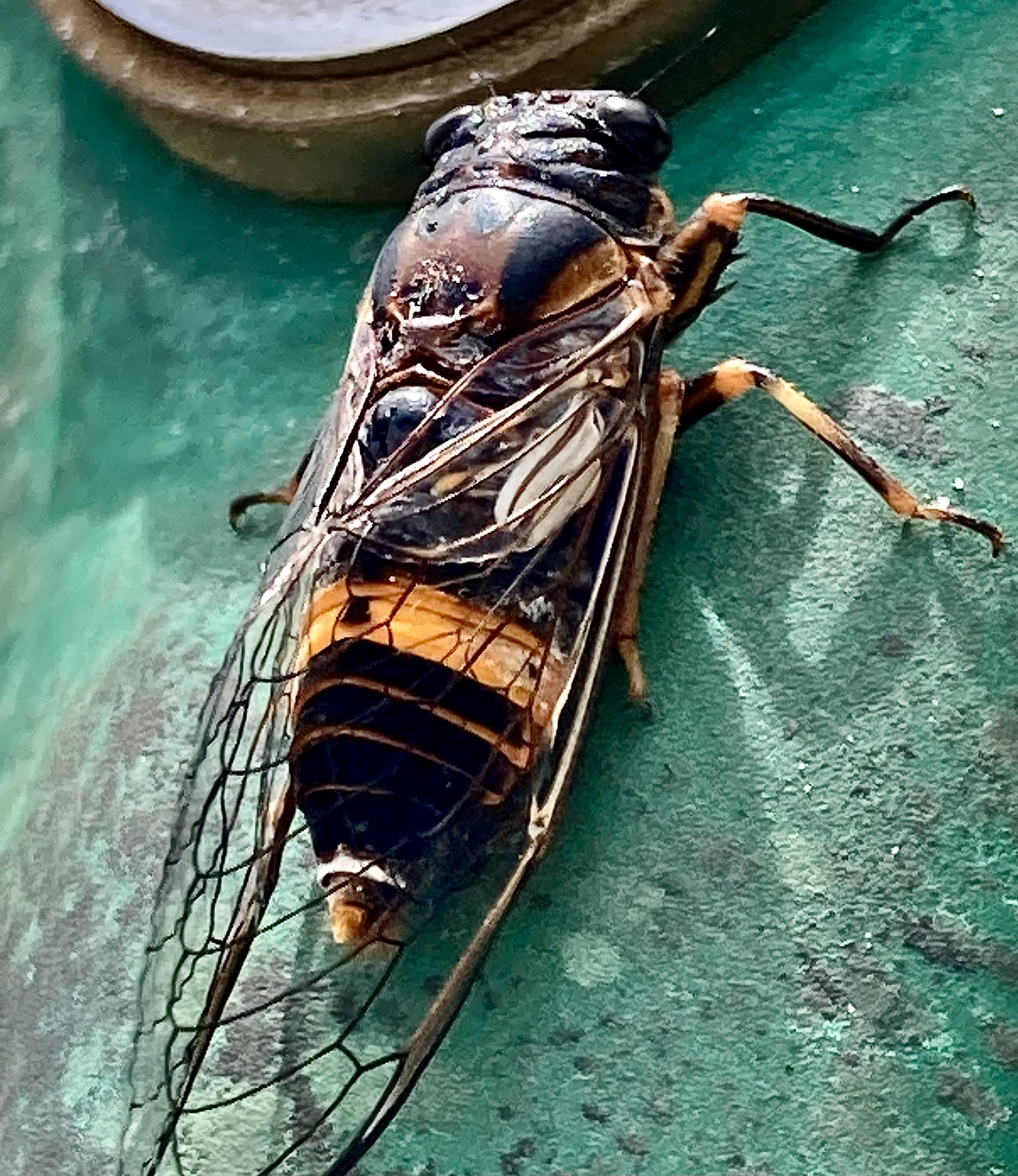

Scientific classification
- Kingdom: Animalia
- Phylum: Arthropoda
- Clade: Pancrustacea
- Class: Insecta
- Order: Hemiptera
- Suborder: Auchenorrhyncha
- Family: Cicadidae
- Genus: Pyropsalta
- Species: P. melete

Binomial name
- Pyropsalta melete (Walker, 1850)

Synonyms
- Cicada melete Walker, 1850; Melampsalta rubricincta Goding & Froggatt, 1904

= Pyropsalta melete =

Species of cicada

Pyropsalta melete is a species of cicada, also known as the red bandit, in the true cicada family, Cicadettinae subfamily and Cicadettini tribe. The species is endemic to Australia. It was described in 1850 by English entomologist Francis Walker.

== Description ==
The length of the forewing is 20–27 mm.

== Distribution and habitat ==
The species occurs in coastal areas of south-west Western Australia, from Dongara southwards to Northcliffe and eastwards to Albany. Associated habitats are open eucalypt forest and woodland.

== Behaviour ==
Adult males may be heard from November to March, clinging to the stems and branches of trees, emitting strident ticking calls.
