= Pyropsalta patula =

Scientific classification
- Kingdom: Animalia
- Phylum: Arthropoda
- Clade: Pancrustacea
- Class: Insecta
- Order: Hemiptera
- Suborder: Auchenorrhyncha
- Family: Cicadidae
- Genus: Pyropsalta
- Species: P. patula

Binomial name
- Pyropsalta patula Moulds & Marshall, 2022

Species of cicada

Pyropsalta patula is a species of cicada, also known as the pale bandit, in the true cicada family, Cicadettinae subfamily and Cicadettini tribe. The species is endemic to Australia. It was described in 2022 by entomologists Maxwell Sydney Moulds and David C. Marshall.

== Etymology ==
The specific epithet patula, from Latin patulus ('broad' or 'wide open'), refers to the enlarged tymbal cavity of the species.

== Description ==
The length of the forewing is 17–23 mm.

== Distribution and habitat ==
The species is only known from the extreme south-west of Western Australia, in the Jarrah Forest bioregion. The holotype specimen was collected at Nannup. Associated habitats are grassy woodland and shrubland.

== Behaviour ==
Adult males may be heard from November to January, while clinging to the stems of grasses.
