= Callcup, Western Australia =

Locality in the Shire of Manjimup, Western Australia

Callcup
- Interactive map of Callcup
- Coordinates: 34.59527°S 115.93770°E
- Country: Australia
- State: Western Australia
- LGA: Shire of Manjimup
- Location: 292 km (181 mi) from Perth; 45 km (28 mi) from Manjimup; 20 km (12 mi) from Pemberton

Government
  - State electorate: Warren-Blackwood
  - Federal division: O'Connor

Area
  - Total: 149.6 km^{2} (57.8 sq mi)

Population
  - Total: 11 (SAL 2021)
- Postcode: 6260
Localities around Callcup
| Yeagarup | Yeagarup | Crowea |
| Yeagarup | Callcup | Meerup |
| Southern Ocean | Meerup | Meerup |

Callcup is a rural locality of the Shire of Manjimup in the South West region of Western Australia, on the coastline of the Southern Ocean. The Warren River forms much of the north-western boundary of the locality and its mouth is just on the other side of the border in Yeagarup. The south-western part of the locality is predominantly covered by the D'Entrecasteaux National Park while, in the north-east, parts of the Greater Hawke National Park are located.

Callcup is located on the traditional land of the Bibulman people of the Noongar nation.

The heritage listed Callcup Stock Route started at Callcup and finished at Nannup. It was last used in the late 1950s. The locality and road were regularly involved in roadworks in the 1940s and early 1950s.
