= Boorara Brook, Western Australia =

Locality in the Shire of Manjimup, Western Australia

Boorara Brook
- other
- Coordinates: 34.64836°S 116.22540°E
- Country: Australia
- State: Western Australia
- LGA: Shire of Manjimup
- Location: 304 km (189 mi) from Perth; 48 km (30 mi) from Manjimup; 7 km (4.3 mi) from Northcliffe

Government
  - State electorate: Warren-Blackwood
  - Federal division: O'Connor

Area
  - Total: 280.4 km^{2} (108.3 sq mi)

Population
  - Total: 143 (SAL 2021)
- Postcode: 6262
Localities around Boorara Brook
| Northcliffe | Crowea | Crowea |
| Meerup | Boorara Brook | Shannon |
| Windy Harbour | Broke | Shannon |

Boorara Brook is a rural locality of the Shire of Manjimup in the South West region of Western Australia. Most of Jane National Park and parts of Boorara-Gardner National Park are located within Boorara Brook.

Boorara Brook is located on the traditional land of the Bibulman people of the Noongar nation.
