= Karri forest =

Tall open forest type

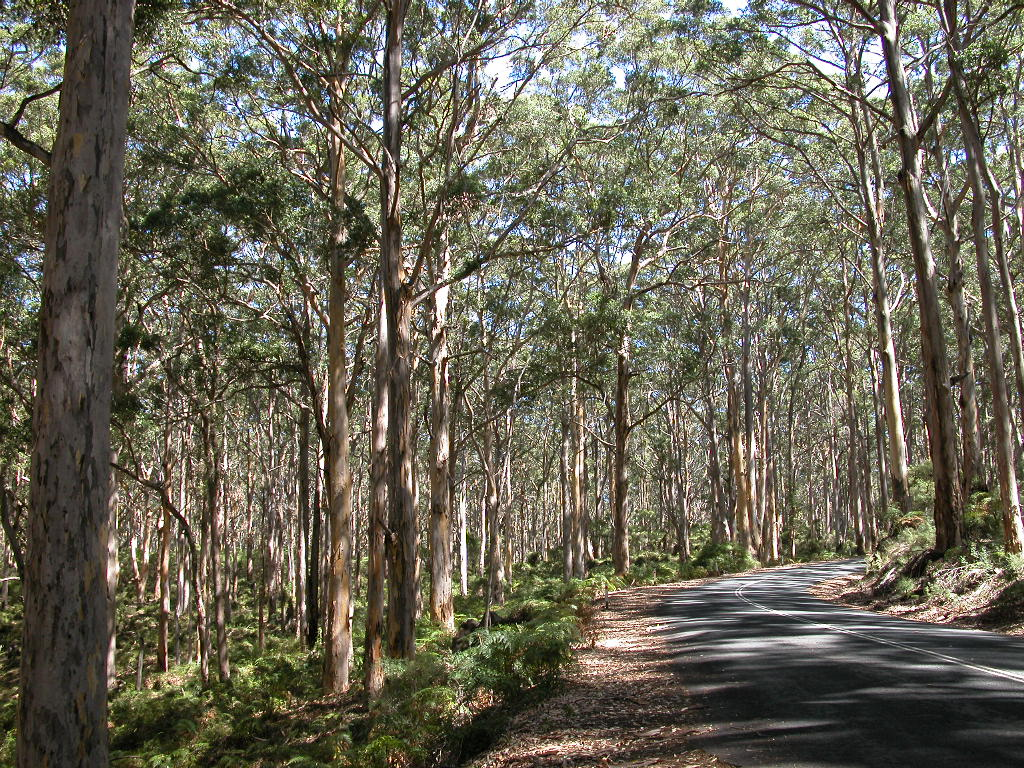
Karri forest

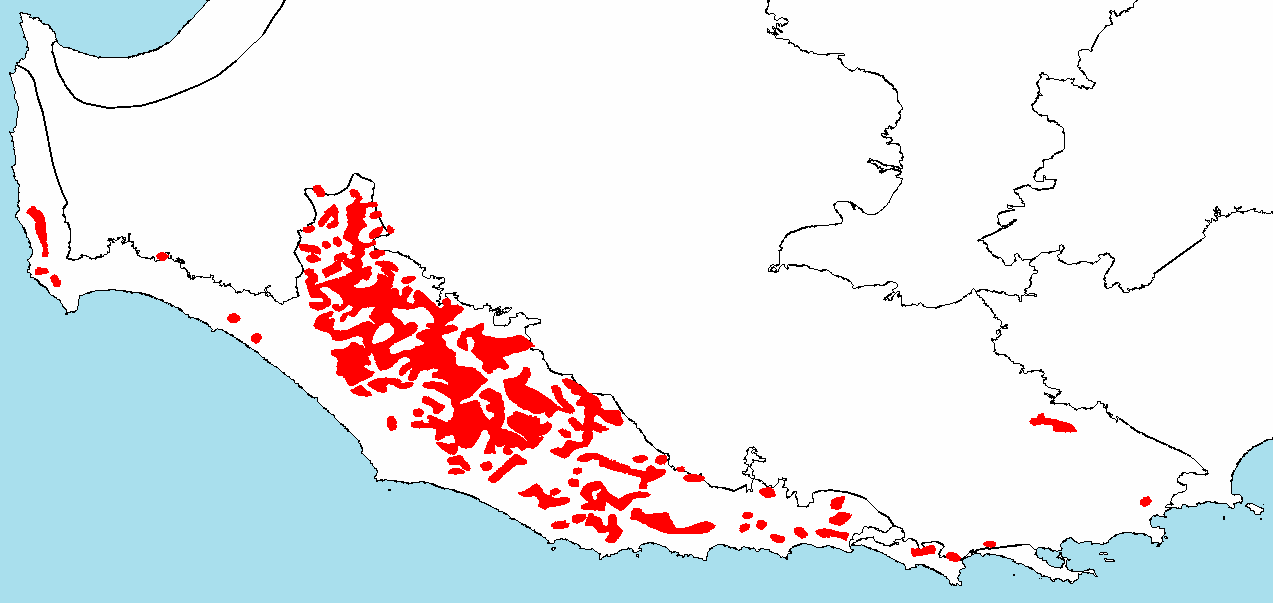
Distribution of karri forest within the Warren biogeographic region

Karri forest is a tall open forest type dominated by Eucalyptus diversicolor (karri), one of the tallest hardwoods in the world.

Karri forest occurs only in the south-west corner of the Southwest Botanical Province of Western Australia, in the Warren biogeographic region. The Warren region is also known as the Karri Forest Region, but this is a misnomer, as only about half of the region is vegetated with karri forest.

From the 1880s onward, karri forest supported timber and firewood industries when access to the forest was improved by a network of the state's railway lines. Small settlements such as Karridale, Deanmill and Pemberton were established around timber mills, and have since become centres for regional tourism.

Some of the remaining areas of karri forest were initially protected in reserves such as Brockman National Park, Warren National Park, Beedelup National Park, and Gloucester National Park. Following campaigning by environmentalists and others the WA government ended the logging of 2 million hectares of native forests, including Karri, in 2024.

== Ecology of the karri forest ==
Karri forest is found on loamy soils, but may include wetlands, river edges, heathland and rocky outcrops. Leaf litter (i.e. twigs, leaves and branches which fall from trees to the ground) plays a substantial role in nutrient recycling and has been measured at 9.45 tonnes per hectare in mature forest. Leaf litter fall and nutrient cycling of calcium, potassium and magnesium in mature forest is the highest reported for any eucalypt forest.

The understorey of karri forest is dense and may reach a height of 10m, according to the conditions of the site and time since the last fire. Understorey leaf material contributes between 30 and 70% of the nutrients by weight, and is particularly important in the cycling of major plant nutrients nitrogen and sulfur, and micro-nutrients copper and zinc.
