= Shannon, Western Australia =

Locality in the Shire of Manjimup, Western Australia

Shannon
- Interactive map of Shannon
- Coordinates: 34.64449°S 116.37616°E
- Country: Australia
- State: Western Australia
- LGA: Shire of Manjimup
- Location: 296 km (184 mi) from Perth; 42 km (26 mi) from Manjimup

Government
  - State electorate: Warren-Blackwood
  - Federal division: O'Connor

Area
  - Total: 671.5 km^{2} (259.3 sq mi)
- Elevation: 210 m (690 ft)

Population
  - Total: 14 (SAL 2021)
- Postcode: 6262
- Mean max temp: 20.5 °C (68.9 °F)
- Mean min temp: 9.8 °C (49.6 °F)
- Annual rainfall: 1,006.4 mm (39.62 in)
Localities around Shannon
Crowea	Quinninup	Lake Muir
Boorara Brook	Shannon	North Walpole
Broke	Broke	North Walpole

Shannon is a rural locality of the Shire of Manjimup in the South West region of Western Australia. The South Western Highway forms the entirety of the eastern border of the locality. The majority of Shannon National Park is located within Shannon, as are parts of D'Entrecasteaux National Park, Jane National Park and Mount Frankland National Park. The Shannon River also flows through the locality.

== History ==
Shannon is on the traditional land of the Mineng people of the Noongar nation.

The river's and locality's name is reported to have been taken from HMS Shannon, a frigate of the Royal Navy, best known for its victory over USS Chesapeake in 1813. Its captain, Philip Broke, is thought to be the source for the name of the neighbouring locality of Broke and the Broke Inlet, while Chesapeake Road leads to the inlet. The names Shannon and Broke for geographical features in the area were first recorded on a map by John Arrowsmith in 1833.

Shannon was the site of a timber mill, with the former location now being a campground in Shannon National Park. The mill operated during the 1950s and 1960s and closed in 1968.

== Geography ==
=== Climate ===
Shannon has a warm-summer mediterranean climate (Köppen: Csb); with warm, dry summers and mild, wet winters. Extreme temperatures ranged from 41.4 °C (106.5 °F) on 20 February 2024 to −2.0 °C (28.4 °F) on 17 June 2006. The wettest recorded day was 16 May 2005 with 80.0 mm (3.15 in) of rainfall.

Climate data for Shannon (34.57°S 116.34°E) (210 m (690 ft) AMSL) (1996-2025)
Month	Jan	Feb	Mar	Apr	May	Jun	Jul	Aug	Sep	Oct	Nov	Dec	Year
Record high °C (°F)	41.0 (105.8)	41.4 (106.5)	41.0 (105.8)	33.1 (91.6)	29.0 (84.2)	22.3 (72.1)	21.0 (69.8)	24.8 (76.6)	28.0 (82.4)	31.5 (88.7)	38.0 (100.4)	41.0 (105.8)	41.4 (106.5)
Mean maximum °C (°F)	37.0 (98.6)	36.3 (97.3)	35.8 (96.4)	29.2 (84.6)	24.3 (75.7)	19.7 (67.5)	18.9 (66.0)	20.4 (68.7)	23.2 (73.8)	27.9 (82.2)	32.4 (90.3)	35.4 (95.7)	38.8 (101.8)
Mean daily maximum °C (°F)	26.7 (80.1)	26.8 (80.2)	24.8 (76.6)	21.3 (70.3)	18.4 (65.1)	15.8 (60.4)	14.9 (58.8)	15.5 (59.9)	16.7 (62.1)	18.8 (65.8)	22.0 (71.6)	24.7 (76.5)	20.5 (69.0)
Daily mean °C (°F)	19.8 (67.6)	20.2 (68.4)	18.8 (65.8)	16.1 (61.0)	13.7 (56.7)	11.8 (53.2)	10.8 (51.4)	11.2 (52.2)	12.1 (53.8)	13.7 (56.7)	16.1 (61.0)	18.1 (64.6)	15.2 (59.4)
Mean daily minimum °C (°F)	12.8 (55.0)	13.6 (56.5)	12.8 (55.0)	10.8 (51.4)	9.0 (48.2)	7.7 (45.9)	6.7 (44.1)	6.9 (44.4)	7.4 (45.3)	8.5 (47.3)	10.1 (50.2)	11.4 (52.5)	9.8 (49.7)
Mean minimum °C (°F)	7.0 (44.6)	7.8 (46.0)	6.6 (43.9)	5.0 (41.0)	3.9 (39.0)	2.4 (36.3)	1.5 (34.7)	2.4 (36.3)	2.7 (36.9)	3.4 (38.1)	5.0 (41.0)	5.7 (42.3)	0.9 (33.6)
Record low °C (°F)	4.0 (39.2)	6.0 (42.8)	3.0 (37.4)	2.0 (35.6)	0.0 (32.0)	−2.0 (28.4)	−1.0 (30.2)	0.0 (32.0)	0.3 (32.5)	1.0 (33.8)	1.0 (33.8)	3.0 (37.4)	−2.0 (28.4)
Average precipitation mm (inches)	16.4 (0.65)	19.1 (0.75)	32.8 (1.29)	70.2 (2.76)	115.3 (4.54)	148.1 (5.83)	183.4 (7.22)	145.8 (5.74)	113.1 (4.45)	76.2 (3.00)	50.2 (1.98)	27.5 (1.08)	1,006.4 (39.62)
Average precipitation days (≥ 0.2 mm)	7.6	7.2	9.7	15.0	19.4	20.9	24.0	21.2	19.1	17.0	12.6	9.0	182.7
Average afternoon relative humidity (%)	49	49	53	60	67	73	73	72	69	65	58	53	62
Average dew point °C (°F)	12.1 (53.8)	12.4 (54.3)	11.8 (53.2)	11.5 (52.7)	10.7 (51.3)	9.5 (49.1)	8.3 (46.9)	8.5 (47.3)	8.6 (47.5)	9.8 (49.6)	10.9 (51.6)	11.2 (52.2)	10.4 (50.8)
Source: Bureau of Meteorology (1996-2025)
