= Pyropsalta amnica =

Scientific classification
- Kingdom: Animalia
- Phylum: Arthropoda
- Clade: Pancrustacea
- Class: Insecta
- Order: Hemiptera
- Suborder: Auchenorrhyncha
- Family: Cicadidae
- Genus: Pyropsalta
- Species: P. amnica

Binomial name
- Pyropsalta amnica Moulds & Marshall, 2022

Species of cicada

Pyropsalta amnica is a species of cicada, also known as the Perth bandit, in the true cicada family, Cicadettinae subfamily and Cicadettini tribe. The species is endemic to Australia. It was described in 2022 by entomologists Maxwell Sydney Moulds and David C. Marshall.

== Etymology ==
The specific epithet amnica, from Latin amnicus ('associated with a stream'), refers to the cicadas’ liking for trees growing near streams.

== Description ==
The length of the forewing is 21–30 mm.

== Distribution and habitat ==
The species is only known from the vicinity of Perth, on the Swan Coastal Plain of south-west Western Australia. Associated habitats are open forest and woodland.

== Behaviour ==
Adult males may be heard from November to January, clinging to the stems of trees, mainly eucalypts.
