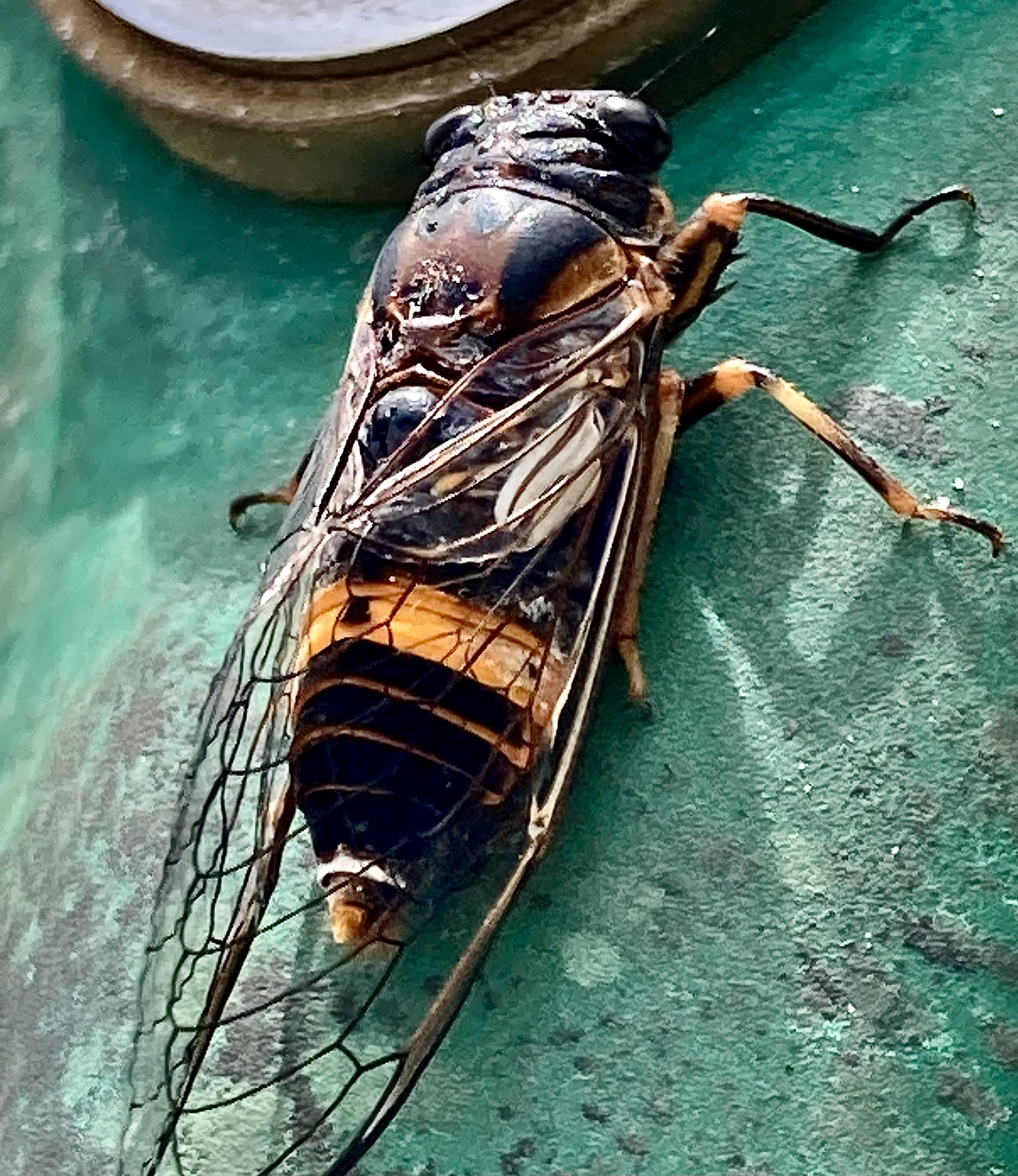
- Pyropsalta melete, Australia

Scientific classification
- Kingdom: Animalia
- Phylum: Arthropoda
- Clade: Pancrustacea
- Class: Insecta
- Order: Hemiptera
- Suborder: Auchenorrhyncha
- Infraorder: Cicadomorpha
- Superfamily: Cicadoidea
- Family: Cicadidae
- Subfamily: Cicadettinae
- Genus: Pyropsalta; Moulds, 2012

= Pyropsalta =

Genus of cicadas

Pyropsalta is a genus of cicadas, also known as bandits, in the family Cicadidae, subfamily Cicadettinae and tribe Cicadettini. It is endemic to Australia. It was described in 2012 by Australian entomologist Maxwell Sydney Moulds.

== Etymology ==
The genus name Pyropsalta is a combination derived from Greek pyropos (fiery) with reference to the fiery-red markings on the type species, with psalta (from Latin psaltria – a female harpist) which is traditionally used as a suffix on many genus names of cicadas .

== Species ==
As of 2025 there were four described species in the genus:

- Pyropsalta amnica Moulds & Marshall, 2022 (Perth Bandit)
- Pyropsalta melete (Walker, 1850) (Red Bandit)
- Pyropsalta patula Moulds & Marshall, 2022 (Pale Bandit)
- Pyropsalta rhythmica Moulds & Marshall, 2022 (Orange Bandit)
