= Meerup, Western Australia =

Locality in the Shire of Manjimup, Western Australia

Meerup
- other
- Coordinates: 34.629625°S 116.003385°E
- Country: Australia
- State: Western Australia
- LGA(s): Shire of Manjimup
- Location: 298 km (185 mi) from Perth; 45 km (28 mi) from Manjimup; 21 km (13 mi) from Pemberton

Government
  - State electorate(s): Warren-Blackwood
  - Federal division(s): O'Connor

Area
  - Total: 240.8 km^{2} (93.0 sq mi)

Population
  - Total(s): 159 (SAL 2021)
- Postcode: 6262
Localities around Meerup
| Callcup | Crowea | Northcliffe |
| Callcup | Meerup | Boorara Brook |
| Southern Ocean | Windy Harbour | Windy Harbour |

Meerup is a rural locality of the Shire of Manjimup in the South West region of Western Australia, on the coastline of the Southern Ocean. The south-western part of the locality, along the coastline, is completely covered by the D'Entrecasteaux National Park with the western section of the Boorara-Gardner National Park bordering the former. In the north, parts of the Greater Hawke National Park are located within Meerup. The Meerup River forms the northern locality's border, near the coast.

Meerup is located on the traditional land of the Bibulman people of the Noongar nation.

In 1905, a longboat of HMS Ringarooma was found washed ashore at the beach at Meerup. The boat, alongside other deck fittings of the ship, was washed overboard during a storm, which had raged along the coastline seven or eight years previously. The ship had been attempting to round Cape Leeuwin but was forced to head back to Albany. Despite its age, the boat was found in good condition.
