= Shannon River (Western Australia) =

River in Western Australia

Coordinates: 34°52′37″S 116°23′34″E

Location
- Country: Australia

Physical characteristics
- Source
  - elevation: 201 metres (659 ft)
- Mouth
  - location: Broke Inlet
- Length: 65 km (40 mi)
- Basin size: 1,000 km^{2} (390 sq mi)
- Discharge
  - average: 157,000 ML/a (5.0 m^{3}/s; 176 cu ft/s)

The Shannon River is a river in the Great Southern region of Western Australia.

The river rises in the forests to the west of Lake Muir and flows in a southerly direction, crossing the South Western Highway just east of Shannon and then continuing south through the Shannon National Park before entering the Broke Inlet. The only tributary of the river is Fish Creek.

The water quality of the river is excellent, fresh and low in sediments. Sandbanks bar the mouth of the river where it enters the inlet.
