= Broke Inlet =

Estuary in Western Australia

- Interactive map of Broke Inlet
- Coordinates: 34°55′40″S 116°26′56″E
- Country: Australia
- State: Western Australia
- LGA: Shire of Manjimup

Broke Inlet, originally named Broke's Inlet, is an inlet in the South West region of Western Australia located 19 kilometres (12 mi) west of Walpole.

The inlet is a large shallow estuary at the eastern end of the d'Entrecasteaux National Park, linked to the Southern Ocean by a narrow seasonally open channel situated between two high sand dune systems.

The inlet is the only large estuary left in the South West that has not been significantly altered by development within its catchment area or along its shores.

The catchment of the inlet has an area of 928 square kilometres (358 sq mi) and the inlet itself has a surface area of 4,800 hectares (11,861 acres) with a total volume of 72,000,000 cubic metres (2.5×10^{9} cu ft). The inlet receives an annual inflow of 187,000,000 cubic metres (6.6×10^{9} cu ft), mostly from the Shannon River, and discharges 157,000,000 cubic metres (5.5×10^{9} cu ft) annually.

The water in the inlet is brackish and generally has half the salinity of sea water. The salinity varies greatly depending on river discharge, the season and whether the bar is open or not.

Broke Inlet is listed as a regionally significant wetland with Environment Australia.

The inlet's and locality's names are thought to be based on Philip Broke, captain of HMS Shannon, a frigate of the Royal Navy, best known for its victory over USS Chesapeake in 1813. Shannon is the name of both a river and a neighbouring locality. Both names were first recorded on a map in 1833.
