= Warren National Park =

National park in Western Australia

- IUCN category II (national park)
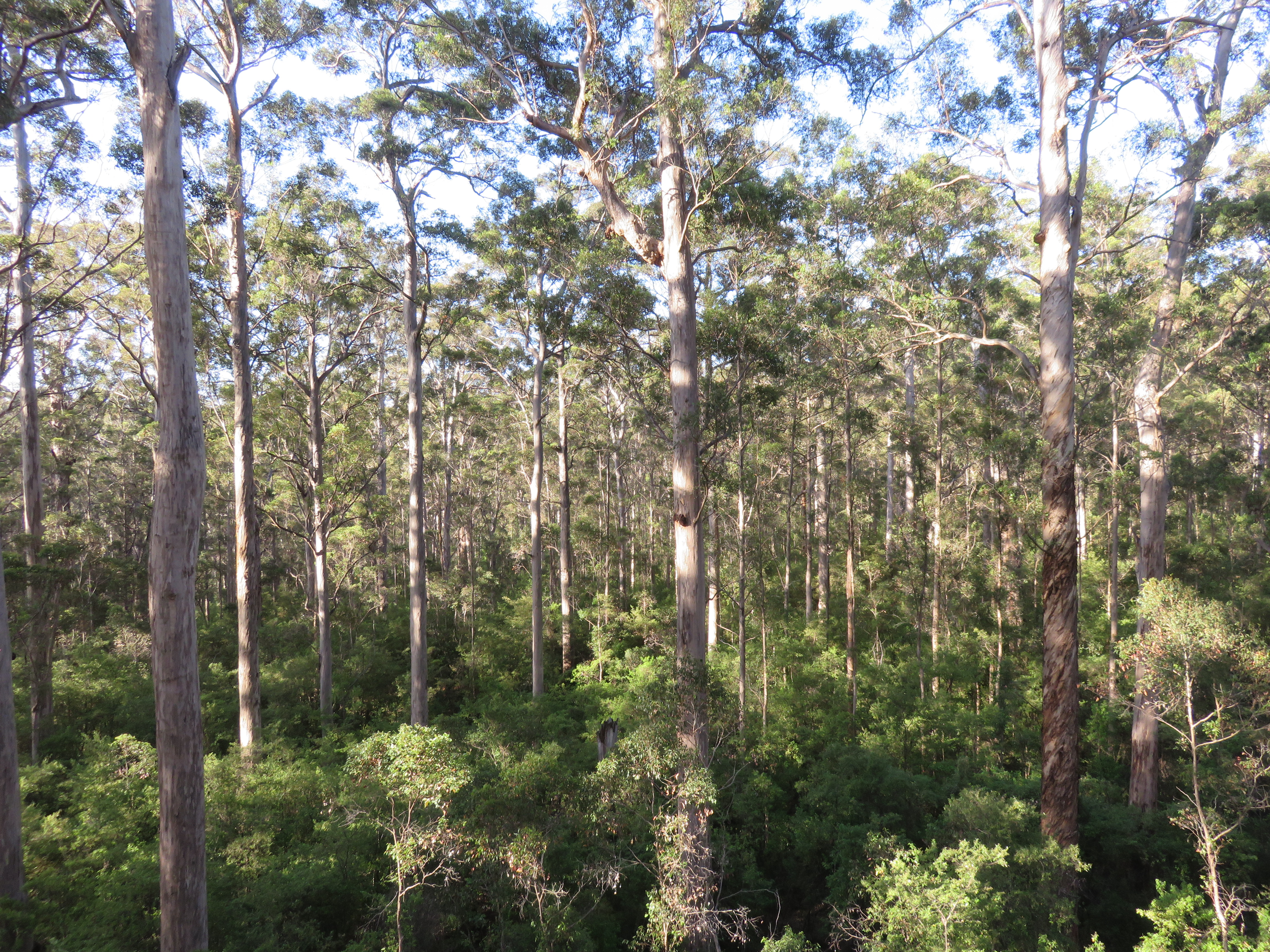
- Karri forest from Dave Evans Bicentennial Tree Tower

- Location within Western Australia
- Location: Western Australia
- Coordinates: 34°30′02″S 115°57′22″E
- Area: 2,981 ha (11.51 sq mi)
- Established: 1977
- Governing body: Department of Parks and Wildlife (Western Australia)
- Website: Official website

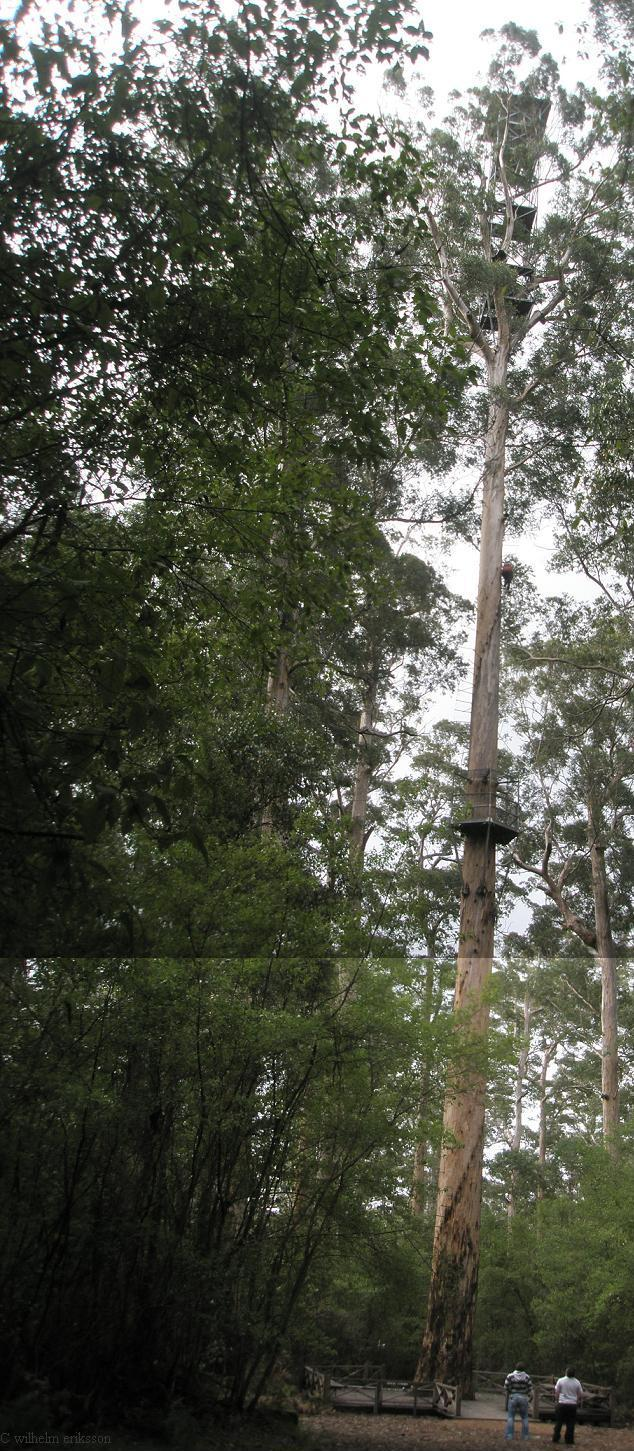
Dave Evans Bicentennial Tree

Warren National Park is a national park in the South West region of Western Australia, 287 km (178 mi) south of Perth and 15 km (9.3 mi) south of Pemberton.

The park is dominated by old growth karri trees, some of which are almost 75 m (246 ft) in height. Some of these trees were used to act as fire lookout towers built during the 1930s and 1940s. The 65 m (213 ft) Dave Evans Bicentennial Tree is situated within the park and was pegged in 1988 as part of Australia's bicentennial celebrations. This is one of three trees found around Pemberton that tourists are able to climb.

The Warren River flows through the park along with many smaller creeks and gullies. The river is plentiful in trout and marron, which can be caught in season.

== See also ==
- Protected areas of Western Australia
