= Northcliffe, Western Australia =

Northcliffe
- Town
- Interactive map of Northcliffe
- Coordinates: 34.633°S 116.124°E
- Country: Australia
- State: Western Australia
- LGA: Shire of Manjimup
- Location: 31 km (19 mi) S of Pemberton; 358 km (222 mi) S of Perth; 203 km (126 mi) WNW of Albany
- Established: 1923

Government
  - State electorate: Warren-Blackwood
  - Federal division: O'Connor

Area
  - Total: 27.4 km^{2} (10.6 sq mi)
- Elevation: 100 m (330 ft)

Population
  - Total: 288 (SAL 2021)
- Postcode: 6262
Localities around Northcliffe
Meerup	Crowea	Boorara Brook
Meerup	Northcliffe	Boorara Brook
Meerup	Boorara Brook	Boorara Brook

Northcliffe is a town in the lower South West region of Western Australia, about 28 kilometres (17 mi) south of the town of Pemberton. It is part of the Shire of Manjimup. At the 2006 census, Northcliffe had a population of 412. Currently, Northcliffe serves a population of around 770 people within the town and surrounding areas. Approximately 31% of the population have post-secondary qualifications.

It is largely surrounded by karri, marri and jarrah forest and is close to the Warren, D'Entrecasteaux and Shannon national parks. Primarily a dairy farming area since the region was populated under the Group Settlement scheme of the 1920s and 1930s, the district was also a centre for the tobacco and logging industries until both ceased, the former in 1960 and the latter under the Regional Forestry Agreement of 1999.

== Geography ==
The town was the centre of a Group Settlement Scheme in the 1920s, and was surveyed at the request of the Premier of Western Australia, James Mitchell in 1923. It became the terminus of the Bridgetown-Jarnadup railway, and was gazetted in May 1924. Mitchell named it after Lord Northcliffe, owner of The Times and the Daily Mail in London, and Director of Propaganda in the British government during World War I, who had died in 1922.

Local community organisations in Northcliffe include Northcliffe Pioneer Museum, Northcliffe Development Committee, Northcliffe Streetscape, Northcliffe Community Resource Centre, Northcliffe Family and Community Centre, Northcliffe Arts Association, Southern Forest Arts, Northcliffe Workers' Club, Northcliffe Recreation Association, Northcliffe Visitor Centre and Northcliffe Town Hall.

Northcliffe is close to Mt Chudalup (a granite monolith), Northcliffe Forest Park and the beaches of Windy Harbour. Indigenous sites of significance include Tookalup.

== Infrastructure ==
The town has a district high school, post office, nursing post, cafe, museum, recreation centre, family and community centre, town hall, visitor centre and library, art gallery, community resource centre with internet access and Centrelink access point, hotel/motel, general store, food shop selling local produce and showcasing produce from the Southern Forests food bowl, and a public playground with barbecue and gazebo.

Northcliffe also serves the coastal holiday village of Windy Harbour.

The Bibbulmun Track walking trail and Munda Biddi bicycle trail both pass through Northcliffe.

There was a railway to Northcliffe, the Northcliffe railway line but the last passenger train was in December 1986.

== Significant events ==
In February, 2015, Northcliffe and Windy Harbour were affected by the largest bushfire in Western Australia's history, which consumed approximately 100,000 hectares (250,000 acres), forcing many of the residents to evacuate, but with no loss of life and minimal property damage. The effect on the forests, however, was extensive, with some affected parts still to show signs of recovery.

== Politics ==
Polling place statistics are presented below from the Northcliffe polling place in the federal and state elections as indicated.

The current MLA for the Warren-Blackwood district is Bevan Eatts of the National Party who won the district in the 2025 state election.

2007 federal election Source: AEC
Liberal	42.3%
Labor	30.2%
Greens	13.5%
Independent	10.9%
One Nation	2.42%

2005 state election Source: WAEC
Liberal	56.1%
Labor	23.2%
Greens	15.6%
New Country	2.30%
One Nation	1.79%

2004 federal election Source: AEC
Liberal	49.7%
Labor	24.6%
Greens	18.6%
One Nation	3.67%
Democrats	1.13%

2001 state election Source: WAEC
Liberal	40.3%
Greens	21.1%
Labor	15.6%
One Nation	13.9%
Independent	7.19%

2001 federal election Source: AEC
Liberal	41.1%
Labor	22.9%
Greens	16.3%
One Nation	12.8%
Democrats	3.69%

1996 state election Source: WAEC
Liberal	58.4%
Labor	25.2%
Democrats	9.51%
CEC	6.94%
