= Tingledale, Western Australia =

Locality in the Shire of Denmark, Western Australia

Tingledale
- other
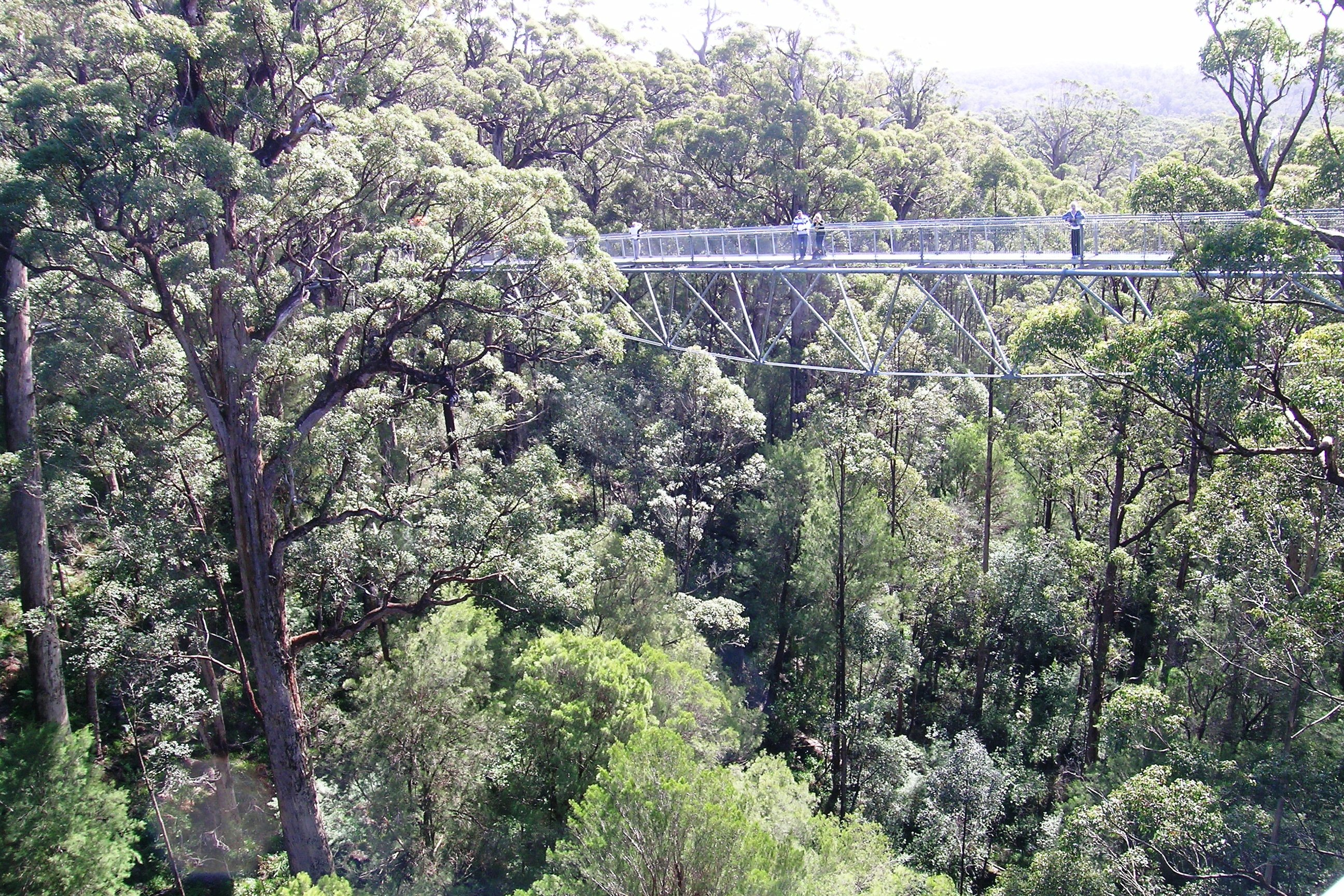
- Valley of the Giants Tree Top Walk in Walpole-Nornalup National Park

- Coordinates: 34.95874°S 116.88199°E
- Country: Australia
- State: Western Australia
- LGA(s): Shire of Denmark
- Location: 347 km (216 mi) SE of Perth; 15 km (9.3 mi) E of Walpole; 42 km (26 mi) W of Denmark

Government
  - State electorate(s): Warren-Blackwood
  - Federal division(s): O'Connor

Area
  - Total: 51.5 km^{2} (19.9 sq mi)

Population
  - Total(s): 57 (SAL 2021)
- Postcode: 6333
Localities around Tingledale
Hazelvale	Trent	Trent
Hazelvale	Tingledale	Bow Bridge
Nornalup	Nornalup	Bow Bridge

Tingledale is a rural locality of the Shire of Denmark in the Great Southern region of Western Australia. The South Coast Highway forms much of the southern border of Tingledale and the Walpole-Nornalup National Park covers the entire south of the locality, with the Valley of the Giants Tree Top Walk located in Tingledale.

== History ==
Tingledale is located on the traditional land of the Noongar.

Tingledale Hall, formerly the Tingledale school, is listed on the shire's heritage register. It is a typical one-teacher school building and dates back to 1925. Tingledale was settled as part of the Group Settlement Scheme, with the school being part of Group Settlement number 116. The school opened in 1925 and remained open until 1938, when declining pupil numbers forced its closure. The school reopened the following year and remained open until 1968. It is now used as a community hall.

The Valley of the Giants and Ancient Empire Trail is also listed on the shire's heritage register, dating to 1996.
