= Parryville, Western Australia =

Locality in the Shire of Denmark, Western Australia

Parryville
- other
- Coordinates: 35.00303°S 117.10383°E
- Country: Australia
- State: Western Australia
- LGA(s): Shire of Denmark
- Location: 358 km (222 mi) SE of Perth; 38 km (24 mi) E of Walpole; 20 km (12 mi) W of Denmark

Government
  - State electorate(s): Warren-Blackwood
  - Federal division(s): O'Connor

Area
  - Total: 79.9 km^{2} (30.8 sq mi)

Population
  - Total(s): 70 (SAL 2021)
- Postcode: 6333
Localities around Parryville
Kentdale	Kordabup	Kordabup
Bow Bridge	Parryville	William Bay
	Southern Ocean

Parryville is a rural locality of the Shire of Denmark in the Great Southern region of Western Australia, on the shore of the Southern Ocean. The South Coast Highway runs through the north of Parryville, and the Owingup and Quarram Nature Reserves are both partially located in Parryville.

== History ==
Parryville is on the traditional land of the Noongar.

The Point Hillier Cairn, located near the south coast of Parryville, is listed on the shire's heritage register. It is rock cairn built as a trigonometric station between 1876 and 1879.

The Parry's Beach Settlement is also on the shire's heritage list. Originally a fishing settlement, only two shacks and a boat shed remain at what is now a popular campsite.

The Parryville Hall and the Parryville Group Settlement House are located in what is now the locality of William Bay, to the east of Parryville. Parryville was settled as part of the Group Settlement Scheme in the 1920s, being part of Group Settlement number 113.

Owingup Swamp, in the west of the locality and now part of the Owingup Nature Reserve, was once seen as an area of great market gardening potential when the Group Settlement was established there.

== Nature reserves ==
The following nature reserves are partially located within Parryville. Both are located within the Warren bioregion:

- Owingup Nature Reserve was gazetted on 16 June 1989 and has a size of 24.59 square kilometres (9.49 sq mi).
- Quarram Nature Reserve was gazetted on 6 February 1976 and has a size of 38.25 square kilometres (14.77 sq mi).
