= Kentdale, Western Australia =

Locality in the Shire of Denmark, Western Australia

Kentdale
- other
- Coordinates: 34.97074°S 117.04666°E
- Country: Australia
- State: Western Australia
- LGA(s): Shire of Denmark
- Location: 350 km (220 mi) SE of Perth; 30 km (19 mi) E of Walpole; 27 km (17 mi) W of Denmark

Government
  - State electorate(s): Warren-Blackwood
  - Federal division(s): O'Connor

Area
  - Total: 65.8 km^{2} (25.4 sq mi)

Population
  - Total(s): 118 (SAL 2021)
- Postcode: 6333
Localities around Kentdale
Trent	Mount Romance	Kordabup
Bow Bridge	Kentdale	Kordabup
Bow Bridge	Parryville	Parryville

Kentdale is a rural locality of the Shire of Denmark in the Great Southern region of Western Australia. The South Coast Highway and the Kent River form much of the southern border of Kentdale, with the Owingup Nature Reserve located along the river.

== History ==
Kentdale is located on the traditional land of the Noongar.

The siding of Owingup on the Elleker to Nornalup railway line is located in the east of the current locality of Kentdale. The siding opened in 1929 and closed in 1957.

Kentdale Hall is listed on the shire's heritage register. It is a typical one-teacher school building and dates back to 1926. Kentdale was settled as part of the Group Settlement Scheme, with the school being part of Group Settlements number 105 and 110. The school opened on 31 May 1926, was named Kentdale in 1929 and remained open until 1947, when declining pupil numbers forced its closure. The school was open again between 1954 and 1960, and the building has since been used as a community hall.

Also heritage listed is Bridge 104 of the South Coast Highway, over the Kent River, at the southern border of Kentdale. It dates to 1954.

== Nature reserve ==
The Owingup Nature Reserve was gazetted on 16 June 1989, has a size of 24.59 square kilometres (9.49 sq mi), and is located in the Warren bioregion.
