= Shadforth, Western Australia =

Locality in the Shire of Denmark, Western Australia

Shadforth
- other
- Coordinates: 34.96405°S 117.28257°E
- Country: Australia
- State: Western Australia
- LGA(s): Shire of Denmark
- Location: 358 km (222 mi) SE of Perth; 46 km (29 mi) E of Walpole; 11 km (6.8 mi) W of Denmark

Government
  - State electorate(s): Warren-Blackwood
  - Federal division(s): O'Connor

Area
  - Total: 45.3 km^{2} (17.5 sq mi)

Population
  - Total(s): 715 (SAL 2021)
- Postcode: 6333
Localities around Shadforth
| Kordabup | Scotsdale | Denmark |
| Kordabup | Shadforth | Denmark |
| William Bay | Ocean Beach | Denmark |

Shadforth is a rural locality of the Shire of Denmark in the Great Southern region of Western Australia. The South Coast Highway forms much of the southern border of Shadforth. The Mount Shadforth Nature Reserve is located in the south of Shadforth, south of the mountain, Mount Shadforth.

== History ==
Shadforth is on the traditional land of the Noongar.

== Nature reserve ==
The Mount Shadforth Nature Reserve was gazetted on 27 July 1923, has a size of 0.84 square kilometres (0.32 sq mi), and is located within the Warren bioregion. The nature reserve is listed on the shire's heritage register and is the only area of karri forest in the shire not to have been logged.
