= Kordabup, Western Australia =

Locality in the Shire of Denmark, Western Australia

Kordabup
- Interactive map of Kordabup
- Coordinates: 34.92612°S 117.14821°E
- Country: Australia
- State: Western Australia
- LGA: Shire of Denmark
- Location: 349 km (217 mi) SE of Perth; 37 km (23 mi) E of Walpole; 21 km (13 mi) W of Denmark

Government
  - State electorate: Warren-Blackwood
  - Federal division: O'Connor

Area
  - Total: 86 km^{2} (33 sq mi)

Population
  - Total: 141 (SAL 2021)
- Postcode: 6333
Localities around Kordabup
Mount Romance	Mount Romance	Scotsdale
Kentdale	Kordabup	Shadforth
Parryville	Parryville	William Bay

Kordabup is a rural locality of the Shire of Denmark in the Great Southern region of Western Australia. The Kordabup Nature Reserve is located within Kordabup.

== History ==
Kordabup is located on the traditional land of the Noongar.

The Styx River, or Kordabup Beela, located in Kordabup, is listed on the shire's heritage register. It is of significant cultural value to the traditional owners of the area.

Kordabup was settled as part of the Group Settlement Scheme in the 1920s, being part of Group Settlement number 114, the Devon and Cornwall Group, named so after the locations of origin of the settlers. A heritage listed parkland in Kordabup, the Devon and Cornwall Group Park, commemorates this heritage.

The siding of Kordabup on the Elleker to Nornalup railway line was located on the southern border of the current locality. The siding opened in 1929 and closed in 1957.

== Nature reserve ==
The Kordabup Nature Reserve was gazetted on 8 December 2004, has a size of 3.02 square kilometres (1.17 mi^{2}), and is located in the Warren bioregion.
