= William Bay, Western Australia =

Locality in the Shire of Denmark, Western Australia

William Bay
- other
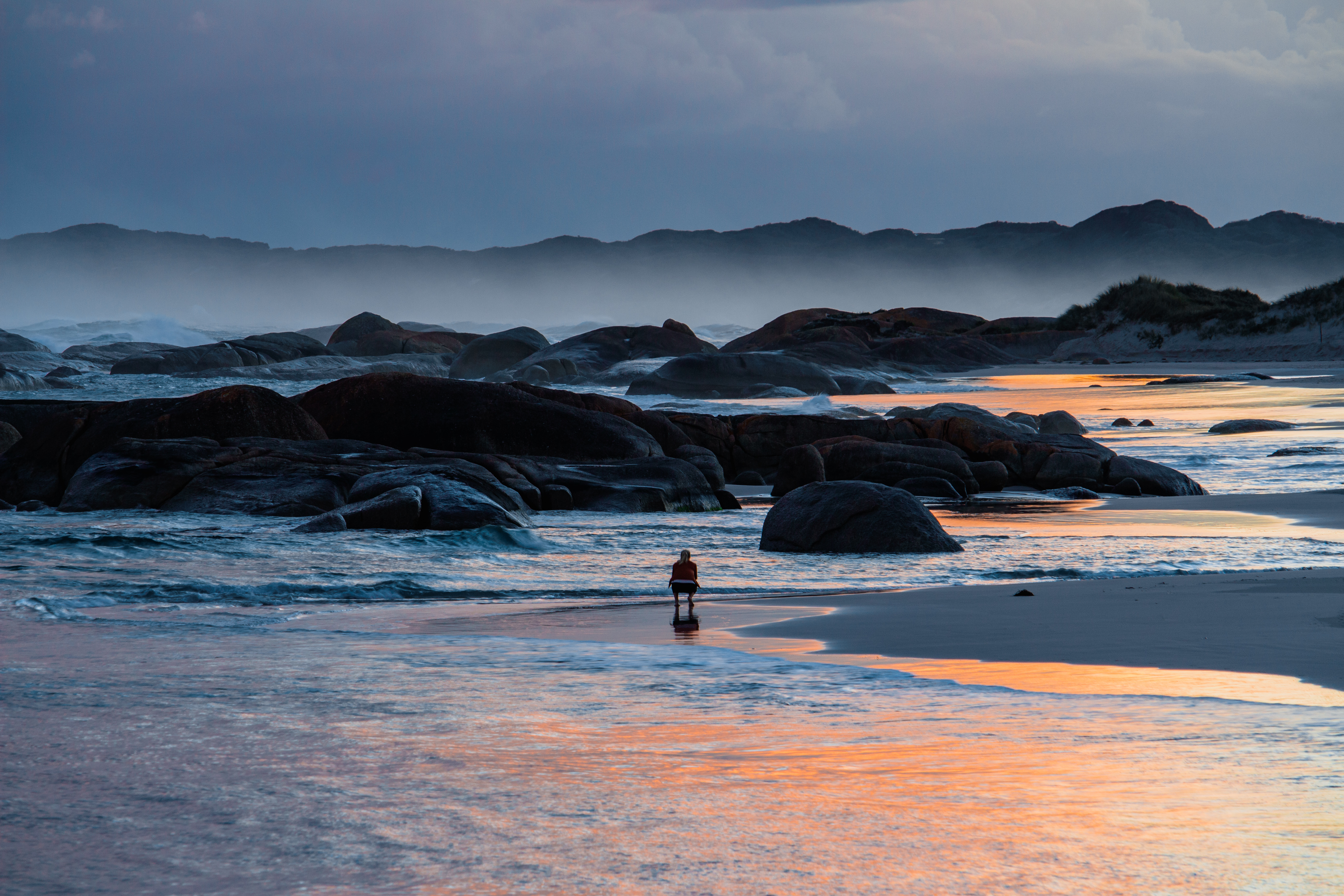
- Greens Pool in William Bay National Park

- Coordinates: 34.99336°S 117.22825°E
- Country: Australia
- State: Western Australia
- LGA(s): Shire of Denmark
- Location: 360 km (220 mi) SE of Perth; 46 km (29 mi) E of Walpole; 12 km (7.5 mi) W of Denmark

Government
  - State electorate(s): Warren-Blackwood
  - Federal division(s): O'Connor

Area
  - Total: 49.2 km^{2} (19.0 sq mi)

Population
  - Total(s): 164 (SAL 2021)
- Postcode: 6333
Localities around William Bay
Kordabup	Kordabup	Shadforth
Parryville	William Bay	Ocean Beach
	Southern Ocean

William Bay is a rural locality of the Shire of Denmark in the Great Southern region of Western Australia, on the shore of the Southern Ocean. The South Coast Highway runs through William Bay from east to west. The entire coastline of William Bay is covered by the William Bay National Park, with both the locality and national park sharing its name with the bay of the Southern Ocean.

== History ==
William Bay is on the traditional land of the Noongar.

The Parryville Hall and the Parryville Group Settlement House are located in William Bay and not in the neighbouring locality of Parryville, despite their name. The area was settled as part of the Group Settlement Scheme in the 1920s, being part of Group Settlement number 113. The William Bay Group Settlement was referred to as Wiltshire in the 1920s and part of the Group Settlements number 41 and 42.

The historic Wynella homestead, also on the shire's heritage register, dates back to at least 1913, but was only moved to its current location from Wagin in 1991. It serves as a living museum of the Group Settlers era.

The siding of William Bay on the Elleker to Nornalup railway line was located on the northern border of the current locality. The siding opened in 1929 and closed in 1957.
