= Mount Romance, Western Australia =

Locality in the Shire of Denmark, Western Australia

Mount Romance
- other
- Coordinates: 34.81043°S 117.13498°E
- Country: Australia
- State: Western Australia
- LGA(s): Shire of Denmark
- Location: 335 km (208 mi) SE of Perth; 44 km (27 mi) NE of Walpole; 29 km (18 mi) NW of Denmark

Government
  - State electorate(s): Warren-Blackwood
  - Federal division(s): O'Connor

Area
  - Total: 306.6 km^{2} (118.4 sq mi)

Population
  - Total(s): 0 (SAL 2016)
- Postcode: 6333
Localities around Mount Romance
Rocky Gully	Perillup	Perillup
Trent	Mount Romance	Mount Lindesay
Kentdale	Kordabup	Scotsdale

Mount Romance is a rural locality of the Shire of Denmark in the Great Southern region of Western Australia. The Kent River flows through Mount Romance from north to south while the Denmark River forms its eastern boundary. Much of the locality is covered by protected areas, the Mount Lindesay National Park and the Mount Roe National Park. The actual mountain, Mount Romance, is located near the centre of the locality.

Mount Romance is on the traditional land of the Noongar.
