= Bow Bridge, Western Australia =

Locality in the Shire of Denmark, Western Australia

Bow Bridge
- Interactive map of Bow Bridge
- Coordinates: 34.967°S 116.953°E
- Country: Australia
- State: Western Australia
- LGA: Shire of Denmark
- Location: 451 km (280 mi) S of Perth; 37 km (23 mi) W of Denmark

Government
  - State electorate: Warren-Blackwood
  - Federal division: O'Connor

Area
  - Total: 112.9 km^{2} (43.6 sq mi)
- Elevation: 13 m (43 ft)

Population
  - Total: 75 (SAL 2021)
- Postcode: 6333
Localities around Bow Bridge
Tingledale	Trent	Kentdale
Nornalup	Bow Bridge	Kentdale
Peaceful Bay	Southern Ocean	Parryville

Bow Bridge is a rural locality of the Shire of Denmark in the Great Southern region of Western Australia. It is located between Denmark and Walpole on the South Coast Highway. It is also situated on the Bow River. To the south it borders the Southern Ocean and the Irwin Inlet and, in the east, the Kent River.

Much of the locality is covered by protected areas, with the Walpole-Nornalup National Park in the west and the Quarram and Mehniup Nature Reserves in the south-west. The Owingup Nature Reserve is only partially located within Bow Bridge, in the east, along the Kent River.

Farms were established in the area prior to 1917.

The townsite now consists primarily of the roadhouse that overlooks the bridge. The roadhouse was established prior to 1960 and operates as a fuel station, post office, grocery store and cafe.

The siding of Kent River, Quarram and Marks on the Elleker to Nornalup railway line were located in the current locality of Bow Bridge. All three opened in 1929 and closed in 1957.

== Nature reserves ==
The following named and unnamed nature reserves are located within Bow Bridge. All are located within the Warren bioregion:

- Mehniup Nature Reserve was gazetted on 7 March 1930 and has a size of 2.85 square kilometres (1.10 mi^{2}).
- Owingup Nature Reserve was gazetted on 16 June 1989 and has a size of 24.59 square kilometres (9.49 mi^{2}).
- Quarram Nature Reserve was gazetted on 6 February 1976 and has a size of 38.25 square kilometres (14.77 mi^{2}).
- Unnamed WA31468 Nature Reserve was gazetted on 4 August 1972 and has a size of 0.99 square kilometres (0.38 mi^{2}).
