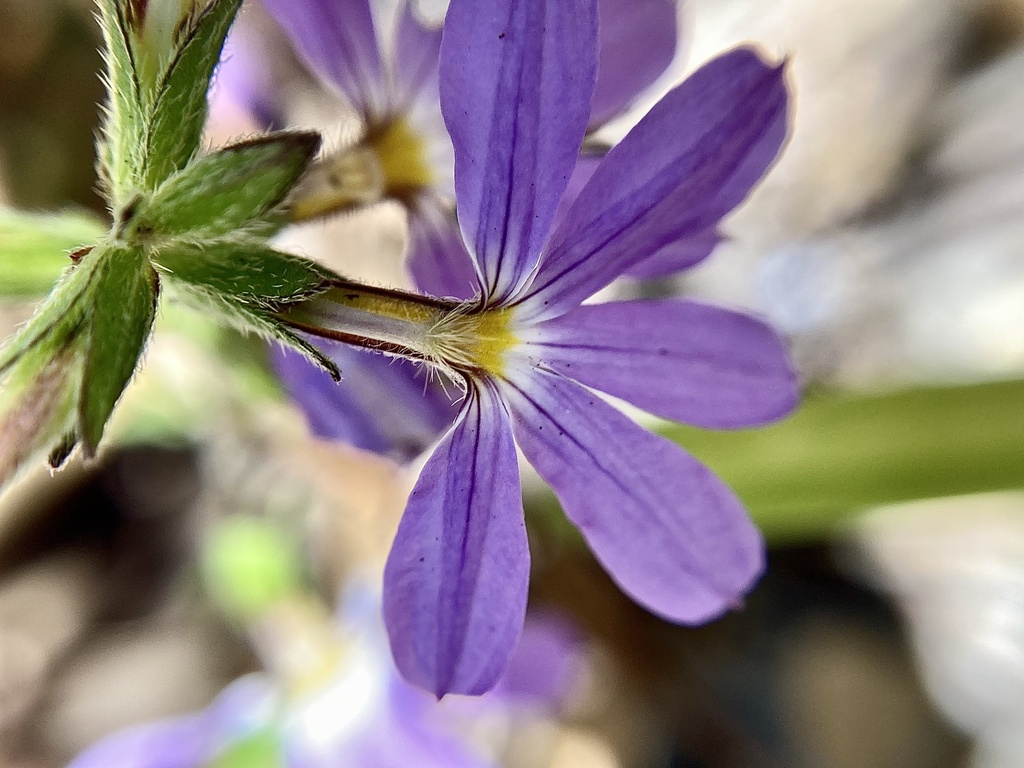
- Near Ocean Beach

Scientific classification
- Kingdom: Plantae
- Clade: Embryophytes
- Clade: Tracheophytes
- Clade: Spermatophytes
- Clade: Angiosperms
- Clade: Eudicots
- Clade: Asterids
- Order: Asterales
- Family: Goodeniaceae
- Genus: Scaevola
- Species: S. microphylla

Binomial name
- Scaevola microphylla (de Vriese) Benth.
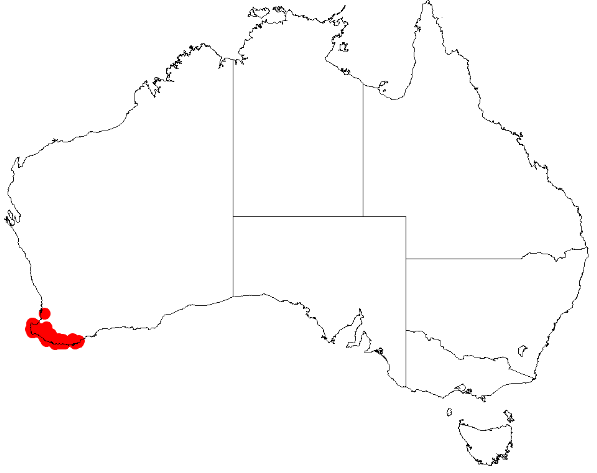
- Occurrence data from AVH

Synonyms
- Lobelia microphylla (de Vriese) Kuntze nom. illeg.; Molkenboeria microphylla de Vriese

= Scaevola microphylla =

Species of flowering plant

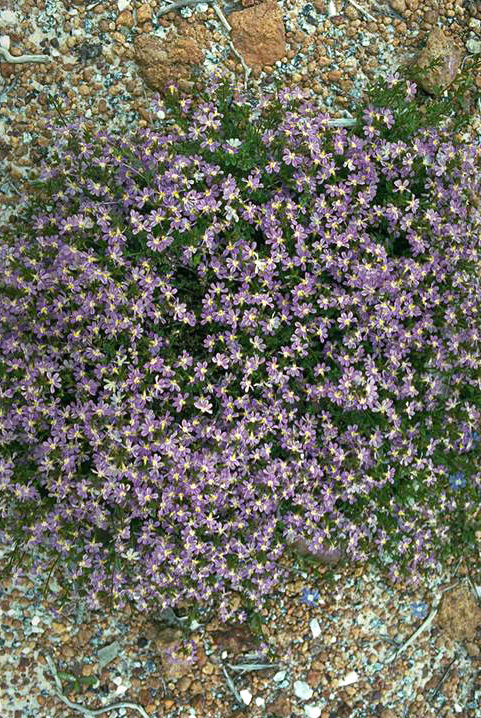
Habit near Walpole

Scaevola microphylla, commonly known as small-leaved scaevola, is a species of flowering plant in the family Goodeniaceae and is endemic to the south-west of Western Australia. It is a prostrate to low-lying herb with sessile, more or less stem-clasping, egg-shaped to elliptic toothed leaves, spikes of blue, pink or white flowers and more or less spherical, hairy fruit.

== Description ==
Scaevola microphylla is a prostrate to low-lying herb with a woody base, with stems up to 50 cm (20 in) long and covered with hairs. Its leaves are sessile, more or less stem-clasping, egg-shaped with the narrower end towards the base to elliptic, 8–53 mm (0.31–2.09 in) long and 3–29 mm (0.12–1.14 in) wide with conspicuous teeth on the edges. The flowers are borne in loose racemes up to 150 mm (5.9 in) long, with leaf-like bracts and oblong bracteoles 5–8 mm (0.20–0.31 in) long. The sepals are broadly egg-shaped, about 0.5 mm (0.020 in) long and joined at the base, and the petals are blue, pink or white, 10–21 mm (0.39–0.83 in) long, sometimes with soft hairs on the outside and bearded inside. The ovary has two locules. Flowering occurs from September to January, and the fruit is more or less cylindrical, 2–3 mm (0.079–0.118 in) in diameter and covered with soft hairs.

== Taxonomy ==
The species was first formally described in 1850 by Willem Hendrik de Vriese who gave it the name who gave it the name Molkenboeria microphylla in the journal Natuurkundige verhandelingen van de Hollandsche Maatschappij der Wetenschappen te Haarlem. In 1868 George Bentham assigned it to the genus, Scaevola as S. microphylla in his Flora Australiensis. The specific epithet (microphylla) means 'small-leaved'.

== Distribution and habitat ==
This species of Scaevola grows in, and on the edges of forests in the extreme south-west of Western Australia, in the Esperance Plains, Jarrah Forest, Swan Coastal Plain and Warren bioregions.

== Conservation status ==
Scaevola microphylla is listed as 'not threatened' by the Government of Western Australia Department of Biodiversity, Conservation and Attractions.
