= Ocean Beach =

Ocean Beach may refer to a number of localities and beaches:

== Places ==
Australia

- Ocean Beach (Tasmania)
- Ocean Beach, Western Australia, a locality of the Shire of Denmark
  - Ocean Beach (Western Australia), a beach in the above locality

New Zealand

- Ocean Beach, Bluff, Southland
- Ocean Beach, Hawke's Bay, near Havelock North
- Ocean Beach, Northland, near Whangārei
- Ocean Beach, Otago, in Dunedin
- Ocean Beach, Wellington, on Palliser Bay

United States

- Ocean Beach, San Diego, California, also community
- Ocean Beach, San Francisco, California
- Ocean Beach (New London), Connecticut
- Ocean Beach, Monmouth County, New Jersey
- Ocean Beach, Ocean County, New Jersey
- Ocean Beach, New York, a village

== Other ==
- Ocean Beach (album), by the Red House Painters
