= Hazelvale, Western Australia =

Locality in the Shire of Denmark, Western Australia

Hazelvale
- other
- Coordinates: 34.92531°S 116.82222°E
- Country: Australia
- State: Western Australia
- LGA(s): Shire of Denmark
- Location: 340 km (210 mi) SE of Perth; 10 km (6.2 mi) NE of Walpole; 50 km (31 mi) W of Denmark

Government
  - State electorate(s): Warren-Blackwood
  - Federal division(s): O'Connor

Area
  - Total: 53.1 km^{2} (20.5 sq mi)

Population
  - Total(s): 83 (SAL 2021)
- Postcode: 6333
Localities around Hazelvale
Trent	Trent	Trent
North Walpole	Hazelvale	Tingledale
Walpole	Nornalup	Tingledale

Hazelvale is a rural locality of the Shire of Denmark in the Great Southern region of Western Australia. The Frankland River forms much of the western border of Hazelvale. The Walpole-Nornalup National Park extends into the south-west of the locality.

== History ==
Hazelvale is located on the traditional land of the Noongar.

The Hazelvale School and teacher's residence is listed on the shire's heritage register. Hazelvale was settled as part of the Group Settlement Scheme, being part of Group 139, originally under the name of Hazelwood. The school operated continuously from 1928 until 1941, when a teacher shortage because of the war forced its closure. The school did not reopen after the end of the war, with pupils attending school in Walpole instead.

The Sappers Bridge is also listed on the shire's heritage register and is located on the border of Hazelvale and Walpole. One of the few bridges over the Frankland River, the bridge was constructed in late 1982 by the 22nd Construction Squadron of the Royal Australian Engineers for the National Parks Authority of Western Australia as part of a construction exercise. The timber bridge replaced a previous structure that had been damaged by floods. The bridge is utilised by the Bibbulmun Track.
