= Peaceful Bay, Western Australia =

Locality in Western Australia

Peaceful Bay
- Town
- Aerial view of the village and bay, 1980

- Interactive map of Peaceful Bay
- Coordinates: 35.03869°S 116.92776°E
- Country: Australia
- State: Western Australia
- LGA: Shire of Denmark

Government
  - State electorate: Warren-Blackwood
  - Federal division: O'Connor

Area
  - Total: 25.5 km^{2} (9.8 sq mi)

Population
  - Total: 71 (SAL 2021)
- Postcode: 6333
Localities around Peaceful Bay
Nornalup	Bow Bridge
Nornalup Inlet	Peaceful Bay	Denmark
Indian Ocean	Indian Ocean	Indian Ocean

Peaceful Bay is a village and locality in the Shire of Denmark, Great Southern region of Western Australia.

== Geography ==
The village is partially surrounded by Walpole-Nornalup National Park, and is mostly residential with a small area zoned for tourism. There is a chalet development. Peaceful Bay Road leads out of the village; the original Peaceful Bay settlement is on the road and is considered of historical value. The bay to the east of the town is called Foul Bay.

== Politics ==
Peaceful bay is represented in the Parliament of Australia by the Division of O'Connor, and in the Western Australian Legislative Assembly by the electoral district of Warren-Blackwood. At the local level, it is part of the Shire of Denmark.

== Census data ==
In the 2021 census, Peaceful Bay had a population of 71 people, with 19 families and 261 private dwellings. There was an average of 1.8 people and 1.6 motor vehicles per dwelling.

== Climate ==
Peaceful Bay has a Csb climate.
