= Dodonaea humifusa =

Scientific classification
- Kingdom: Plantae
- Clade: Tracheophytes
- Clade: Angiosperms
- Clade: Eudicots
- Clade: Rosids
- Order: Sapindales
- Family: Sapindaceae
- Genus: Dodonaea
- Species: D. humifusa

Binomial name
- Dodonaea humifusa Miq.

Synonyms
- Dodonaea humifusa Miq. var. humifusa

Species of shrub

Dodonaea humifusa is a species of plant in the family Sapindaceae and is endemic to the south-west of Western Australia. It is a prostrate shrub with simple, sessile, egg-shaped or lance-shaped leaves with the narrower end towards the base, single flowers usually with eight stamens, and four-angled capsules.

== Description ==
Dodonaea humifusa is usually a dioecious prostrate shrub that typically grows to a height of up to 1 m (3 ft 3 in). Its leaves are simple, sessile, egg-shaped to lance shaped with the narrower end towards the base, mostly 10–25 mm (0.39–0.98 in) long and 2–8 mm (0.079–0.315 in) wide. The flowers are borne singly on a pedicel 5–22 mm (0.20–0.87 in) long, with four or five egg-shaped sepals 2.3–5 mm (0.091–0.197 in) long that fall off as the flowers open. Each flower has eight to nine stamens and an ovary that is glabrous or covered with fine, soft hairs. The fruit is a four-angled capsule, 4.0–8.5 mm (0.16–0.33 in) long, 4.0–8 mm (0.16–0.31 in) wide, with appendages that are sometimes absent or lobe-like.

== Taxonomy and naming ==
Dodonaea humifusa was first formally described in 1845 by Friedrich Anton Wilhelm Miquel in Lehmann's Plantae Preissianae from specimens collected in the Hay district in 1840. The specific epithet (humifusa) means 'procumbent'.

== Distribution and habitat ==
This species of Dodonaea grows in open wandoo woodland on sandy loam from near Narrogin and south to the coast and east to Jerramungup in the Avon Wheatbelt, Esperance Plains, Jarrah Forest and Mallee bioregions of south-western Western Australia.
