= List of State Register of Heritage Places in the Shire of Denmark =

The State Register of Heritage Places is maintained by the Heritage Council of Western Australia. As of 2026, 142 places are heritage-listed in the Shire of Denmark, of which three are on the State Register of Heritage Places.

== List ==
=== State Register of Heritage Places ===
The Western Australian State Register of Heritage Places, as of 2026, lists the following three state registered places within the Shire of Denmark:

| Place name | Place # | Street number | Street name | Suburb or town | Co-ordinates | Notes & former names | Photo |
|---|---|---|---|---|---|---|---|
| Old Denmark District Hospital | 14171 | | North Street | Denmark | 34.95781°S 117.354266°E | Denmark District Hospital | |
| Peace Tree | 14309 | Corner | Horsley & Scotsdale Roads | Denmark | 34.956775°S 117.354512°E | Norfolk Pine planted in 1918 | |
| Red Cross Centre and Shop | 14403 | Corner | Price & Mitchell Streets | Denmark | 34.961609°S 117.354643°E | Methodist Church | |

=== Shire of Denmark heritage-listed places ===
The following places are heritage listed in the Shire of Denmark but are not State registered:

| Place name | Place # | Street number | Street name | Suburb or town | Notes & former names | Photo |
|---|---|---|---|---|---|---|
| Denmark Police Quarters | 674 | | Harper Street | Denmark | | |
| Old Police Station | 675 | 16 | Mitchell Street | Denmark | Police Station | |
| St Mary's Roman Catholic Church | 676 | | South Coast Highway | Denmark | | |
| Denmark Masonic Hall | 677 | 11 | Ocean Beach Road | Denmark | | |
| Uniting Church | 678 | 983 | South Coast Highway | Denmark | | |
| National Bank | 679 | | Strickland Street | Denmark | | |
| Denmark Post Office (former) | 680 | Corner | Crellin Road & Inlet Drive | Denmark | Pre-Primary Centre | |
| Agricultural Bank of WA | 681 | 77 | Strickland Street | Denmark | Bankwest, R&I Bank | |
| RSL Memorial Hall | 682 | 54 | Strickland Street | Denmark | RSL Hall | |
| St Leonard's Anglican Church | 683 | 4 | Mitchell Street | Denmark | Mission Church | |
| Denmark-Nornalup Railway | 1041 | | Nornalup to Hay River | Denmark | Aggie Track, Old Denmark Railway Line and Railway Bridge | |
| The Rectory | 3267 | 39 | Scotsdale Road | Denmark | St Leonard's, Church of England Rectory | |
| Denmark River Railway Bridge | 3394 | Corner | Hollings Road & Inlet Drive | Denmark | part of the Elleker to Nornalup railway line | |
| Hamilton House | 3421 | | | Denmark | | |
| Hay River Railway Bridge | 3516 | | Adjacent to South Coast Highway, Across Hay River | Denmark | part of the Elleker to Nornalup railway line | |
| Old Denmark Agricultural College | 4307 | | South Coast Highway | Denmark | School of Agriculture | |
| Scotsdale Road Bridge | 4636 | | Scotsdale Road | Denmark | Millars Timber Co Tramway Bridge | |
| Denmark Primary School | 9798 | | Mitchell Street | Denmark | Denmark District High School | |
| Hamilton Road Bridge (former) over Denmark River | 11468 | | Hamilton Road off Scotsdale Road over Denmark River | Denmark | MRWA 4499 | |
| Teacher's Quarters (former) | 13932 | 11 | Price Street | Denmark | Schoolmaster's House | |
| Berridge Park | 14300 | | Hollings Road | Denmark | The Esplanade, The Oval, Centenary Park | |
| Denmark Railway Station (former) | 14301 | | Morgan Road | Denmark | Bowling Club, part of the Elleker to Nornalup railway line | |
| Tobacco Kiln | 14302 | 6503 | South Coast Highway | Nornalup | Wylie Place, Clan William | |
| Country Women's Association Rest Rooms | 14303 | | Mitchell Street | Denmark | | |
| Craig's Building | 14304 | 66-70 | Strickland Street | Denmark | HS Craig Universal Store | |
| Denmark Pre-Primary Unit 1 | 14305 | | South Coast Highway | Denmark | | |
| Denmark Public Cemetery | 14306 | | South Coast Highway | Denmark | | |
| Denmark River Traffic Bridge | 14307 | | South Coast Highway | Denmark | The Traffic Bridge | |
| Devon and Cornwall Group Park | 14308 | | Fernley Road | Denmark | Styx River Settlers Park | |
| Disused Railway Reserves and Bridges | 14310 | | | Denmark | part of the Torbay-Denmark Railway - Denmark-Nornalup Railway | |
| Federal Street Precinct | 14311 | Jan-00 | Federal Street | Denmark | | |
| Waiting House | 14312 | 4 | Brazier Street | Denmark | Infant Health Centre, Waiting Room, Alfred & Eva Carson Hostel | |
| Group Settlement House (Parryville) | 14313 | | Pates Road | Denmark | | |
| Harewood Forest | 14314 | | Scotsdale Road | Denmark | | |
| House - 12 Welsh Street | 14315 | 12 | Welsh Street | Denmark | | |
| House - 24 Price Street | 14316 | 24 | Price Street | Denmark | | |
| House | 14317 | 44 | Hollings Road | Denmark | | |
| House - 61 South Coast Highway | 14318 | 61 | South Coast Highway | Denmark | Mrs Church's House | |
| House - 90 Strickland Street | 14319 | 90 | Strickland Street | Denmark | | |
| House - 2146 South Coast Highway | 14320 | Lot 908 | South Coast Highway | Denmark | Piese House | |
| Powley's House | 14321 | 185 | Howe Road | Denmark | Ross Trevor, Jackson's Place | |
| John Clark Memorial Bandstand | 14322 | | Denmark River Foreshore | Denmark | | |
| Karri Trees; both sides of South Coast Highway on the Eastern approach to town | 14323 | both sides | South Coast Highway, between Agric School & Highway Bridge | Denmark | | |
| Karri Trees | 14324 | | South Coast Highway, between Tavern & Buckley Streets | Denmark | | |
| Karri Trees - Lights Road | 14325 | | Lights Road verges | Denmark | | |
| Kentdale Hall | 14334 | | Parker Road | Kentdale | Kentdale School | |
| Moreton Bay Fig Tree | 14336 | | Strickland Street Shopping Complex | Denmark | Fig Tree Complex | |
| Butter Factory | 14338 | | Mount Shadforth Road | Denmark | Great Southern Co-operative Butter Company | |
| Old Town Dam (Millars Dam) | 14340 | | Mt Shadforth Road | Denmark | Butter Factory Dam, Millar's Dam | |
| Original Peaceful Bay | 14343 | | Peaceful Bay Road | Peaceful Bay | | |
| Parker's House | 14396 | | South Coast Highway | Kenton | Harry Parker's House, Kent River Cottage | |
| Parry's Beach Settlement | 14398 | | Parry's Beach | Denmark | | |
| Parryville Hall | 14399 | | South Coast Highway | Denmark | Parryville School (former) | |
| Plane Tree | 14400 | 41 | Mitchell Street | Denmark | | |
| Point Hillier Cairn | 14401 | | Point Hillier | Denmark | | |
| Randall Park | 14402 | | South Coast Highway | Denmark | Gun Park, Coronation Park | |
| Nockolds' Store (Nockolds' Bros - General Merchants) | 14404 | 20-22 | South Coast Highway | Denmark | Ricketts' and Co | |
| Karri Trees; South Coast Highway western approach to town | 14405 | | South Coast Highway | Denmark | | |
| Scotsdale Hall | 14406 | | Scotsdale Road | Denmark | | |
| Seventh Day Adventist Church | 14407 | 32 | Mitchell Street | Denmark | Denmark Town Hall | |
| Denmark War Memorial | 14408 | Corner | Hollings Road & South Coast Highway | Denmark | War Memorial | |
| The Bungalow | 14409 | 6681 | South Coast Highway | Nornalup | | |
| Tingledale Hall | 14410 | | Valley of the Giants Road | Denmark | Tingledale School | |
| Valley of the Giants & Ancient Empire Trail | 14411 | | Valley of the Giants Road 4 km from | Nornalup | Tree Top Walk | |
| Urban Bushland Waste Water Works Reserve | 14412 | bounded by | Hodgson/Brazier/Inlet Drv & Campbell | Denmark | | |
| Urban bushland Denmark District High School Reserve | 14413 | bounded | Brazier/Buckley/Patterson & Mitchell Roads | Denmark | | |
| Recreation Centre & Oval Reserve | 14414 | bounded | by Brazier/Barnett/Holling & Haire Streets | Denmark | | |
| River Reserve | 14415 | bounded by | Holling Street/Golf Course & Trot Trk | Denmark | | |
| Teesdale Lane Reserve | 14416 | 72 | South Coast Highway | Denmark | Urban Bushland Frail and Aged Lodge Grounds | |
| Urban Bushland Hardy Street Reserve | 14417 | bounded by | South Coast Highway, Hardy Street, Mt Shadforth, back of Lionsville | Denmark | | |
| Jamieson Hill | 14418 | North of | Christina Crescent & Harpendene Rise | Denmark | | |
| Pioneer Park | 14419 | | South Coast Highway/Ocean Beach Road & Buckley Road | Denmark | | |
| Industrial Estate Reserve | 14421 | between | Industrial & Zimmermann Roads | Denmark | | |
| Urban Bushland Patterson Street Reserve | 14422 | | Patterson Street | Denmark | | |
| South Coast Highway - Eastern Approach | 14423 | | South Coast Highway | Denmark | | |
| Wynella | 14424 | | South Coast Highway | Denmark | | |
| Whittakers Sawmill Site | 14425 | Corner | South Coast Highway & Cussons Road | Denmark | McLeans Sawmill Site | |
| Shingle Hut and Stables | 14426 | 723 | South Coast Highway | Bow Bridge | Saw's Shingle Hut | |
| Denmark Fire Station | 14496 | | Peace Street | Denmark | | |
| Denmark Church | 15055 | Corner | South Coast Highway & Moore Street | Denmark | | |
| Manse | 15063 | 9 | Brazier Street | Denmark | | |
| Karri Creek Road Bridge | 15402 | | South Western Highway | Denmark | MRWA 103a | |
| Mt Hallowell Reserve | 15929 | | | Denmark | | |
| Denmark Community Park | 16291 | | Scotsdale Road | Denmark | Denmark Research Station & Manager's, Residence (former), Denmark State Farm | |
| Agricultural Research Station Manager's House (former), Denmark | 16304 | | | Denmark | | |
| Denmark Police Station | 17441 | | South Coast Highway | Denmark | | |
| William Bay National Park | 18748 | | William Bay Road | Denmark | | |
| Mitchell Street Precinct | 19895 | | Mitchell Street | Denmark | | |
| Bow River | 23796 | | South Coast Highway | Bow Bridge | | |
| Karri and Marri trees on Mount Barker Road | 23798 | | Churchill Road to South Coast Highway | Denmark | | |
| Bernard Bellanger Home | 23800 | 54 | Riverside Drive | Frankland | Bernie's | |
| Denmark River | 23801 | | Denmark River | Denmark | Kwoorabup Beela | |
| Mt Shadforth Nature Reserve | 23805 | 409 | Illsley Drive | Denmark | | |
| Frankland River & Nornalup Inlet | 23807 | | South Coast Highway | Nornalup | Kwakoorillup Beela | |
| Morrison's Newsagency | 23814 | 30 | South Coast Highway | Denmark | Nockolds' Shops | |
| Strickland Street Precinct | 23815 | | Strickland Street | Denmark | | |
| Denmark Hotel | 23826 | 30 | Hollings Road | Denmark | | |
| Hazelvale School and Teacher's Residence | 23833 | 916 | Hazelvale Road | Hazelvale | | |
| Myers Packing Shed | 23835 | 28 | Myers Road | Denmark | | |
| Karri Cottage | 23836 | 88 | Riverside Drive | Nornalup | | |
| Boat and Angling Club Slipway | 23850 | 34 | South Coast Highway | Denmark | | |
| Wilkies | 23852 | 26 | Riverside Drive | Nornalup | Orana, Cook's | |
| Denmark Arts Council Offices | 23853 | 41 | Mitchell Street | Denmark | Infant Health Centre | |
| Poison Point | 23855 | | Inlet Drive | Denmark | Pinniger Point | |
| Sappers Bridge | 23857 | | Frankland River | Tingledale | | |
| Denmark Environment Centre & Mural | 23859 | 33-37 | Strickland Street | Denmark | Berridge Building | |
| Nornalup Tea House | 23867 | 6684 | South Coast Highway | Nornalup | Old Telephone Exchange, Karri Moar, Shaws | |
| Forest Hill and Moriarty - Camballup Trails | 23870 | | Hay Land District to the west and south- west of Mount Barker | Mount Barker | | |
| Yurnga Residence | 23871 | 46 | Hollings Road | Denmark | | |
| Wilson Inlet (for Thomas Braidwood Wilson | 23877 | | Inlet Drive | Denmark | The Lake | |
| Mambray Park | 23883 | 732 | Ocean Beach Road | Denmark | Hallowell Park, Winniston Farm | |
| Edinboro House | 23886 | 31 | South Coast Highway | Denmark | The Clark Building | |
| Denmark Cottage Crafts | 23887 | 41 | Mitchell Street | Denmark | Carmarthen Group School | |
| Commercial Building | 23890 | 28 | Hollings Street | Denmark | Fishbones Restaurant, Riverview Coffee House | |
| Styx River | 23892 | | Styx River Road | Kordabup | Kordabup Beela | |
| Blue Lake | 23913 | | DIA Site Number: 4553 | Denmark | Kwoora Kaip | |
| Possum Trapper Cave | 23922 | | Reserve 47891 Above Mitchell River | Denbarker | | |
| Reeve's & Co Butcher Shop | 23923 | 10 | Hollings Road | Denmark | Bayley Butcher Shop | |
| Nash Franz Scout Hall | 23925 | | Brazier Street | Denmark | | |
| Hay River | 23927 | | South Coast Highway | Denmark | Genulup Beela | |
| Station Master's House | 23933 | 952 | Crellin Street | Denmark | Kindergarten and Lions Building | |
| Denmark Cooperative Co. Ltd | 23934 | 33 | South Coast Highway | Denmark | Denmark Co-op | |
| Monastery Landing | 23935 | | Frankland River | Nornalup | | |
| Harewood School | 23936 | 1350 | Scotsdale Road | Denmark | | |
| Frail & Aged Lodge Grounds | 23945 | 2 | Scotsdale Road | Denmark | | |
| Commercial Building | 23948 | 28 | Hollings Road | Denmark | Lambretta Cafe Restaurant, Glovers Fruit Shop, Copenhagen Gift House | |
| Old Post Office | 23951 | 6674 | South Coast Highway | Nornalup | Nornalup Post Office | |
| Murphy's Workshop | 23955 | 1 | Short Street | Denmark | Murphy's Workshops | |
| Springdale Beach | 23958 | | Denmark-Nornalup Rlwy- Heritage Trail | Denmark | Ochre Source and Stone Arrangement | |
| Nornalup Hospital | 23961 | 6676 | South Coast Highway | Nornalup | | |
| RSL Memorial Hall | 23963 | 54 | Strickland Street | Denmark | WWII Gun and Carriage | |
| Bridge, Ashpit and Turntable | 23971 | | Cnr Hollings and Inlet Drive | Denmark | | |
| Cronshaws | 23972 | 6683 | South Coast Highway | Nornalup | Mrs Smith's Haberdashery Store | |
| Mt Lindesay School Group 101 | 23976 | 798 | Scotsdale Road | Denmark | | |
| Kent River Trading Post | 23979 | Lot 2320 | South Coast Highway | Kenton | Parker Hall | |
| Reso Seats | 23981 | | South Coast Highway | Denmark | | |
| Bridge 4338, Horsley Road, Denmark | 26053 | | Horsley Road | | | |
| Bridge 104, South Coast Highway, over Kent River, Kentdale | 26301 | | South Western Highway | Kentdale | | |
| Bibbulmun Track | 27521 | | | From Kalamunda to Albany | | |
