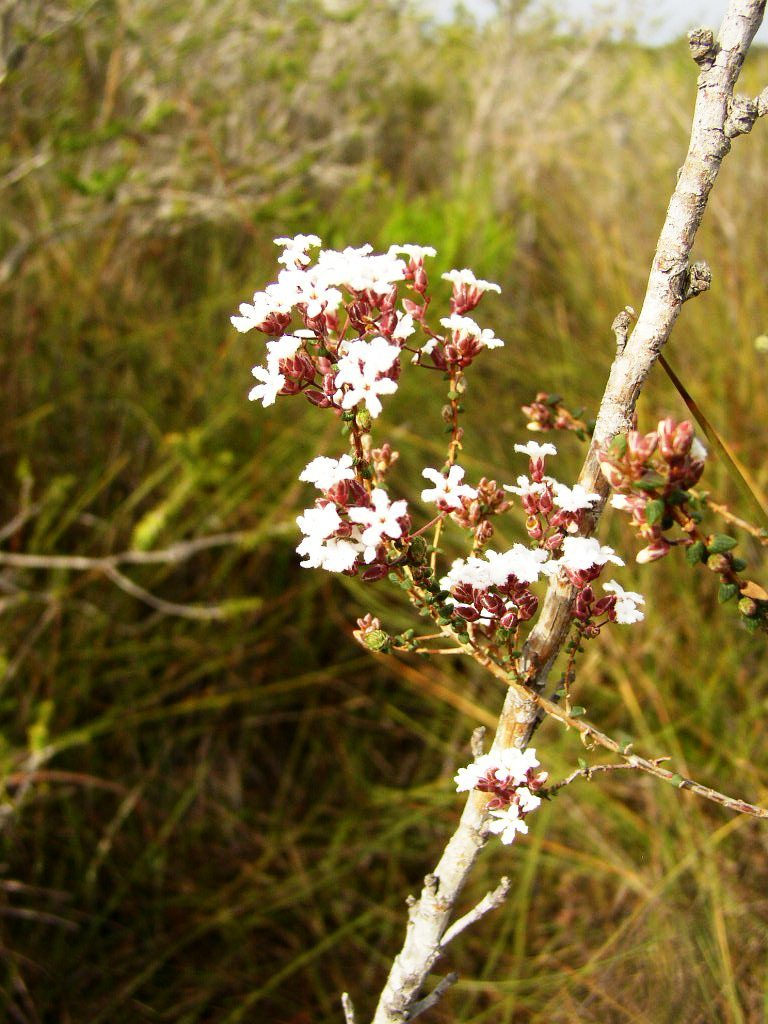
- Near Bow Bridge

Scientific classification
- Kingdom: Plantae
- Clade: Tracheophytes
- Clade: Angiosperms
- Clade: Eudicots
- Clade: Asterids
- Order: Ericales
- Family: Ericaceae
- Genus: Leucopogon
- Species: L. assimilis

Binomial name
- Leucopogon assimilis R.Br.
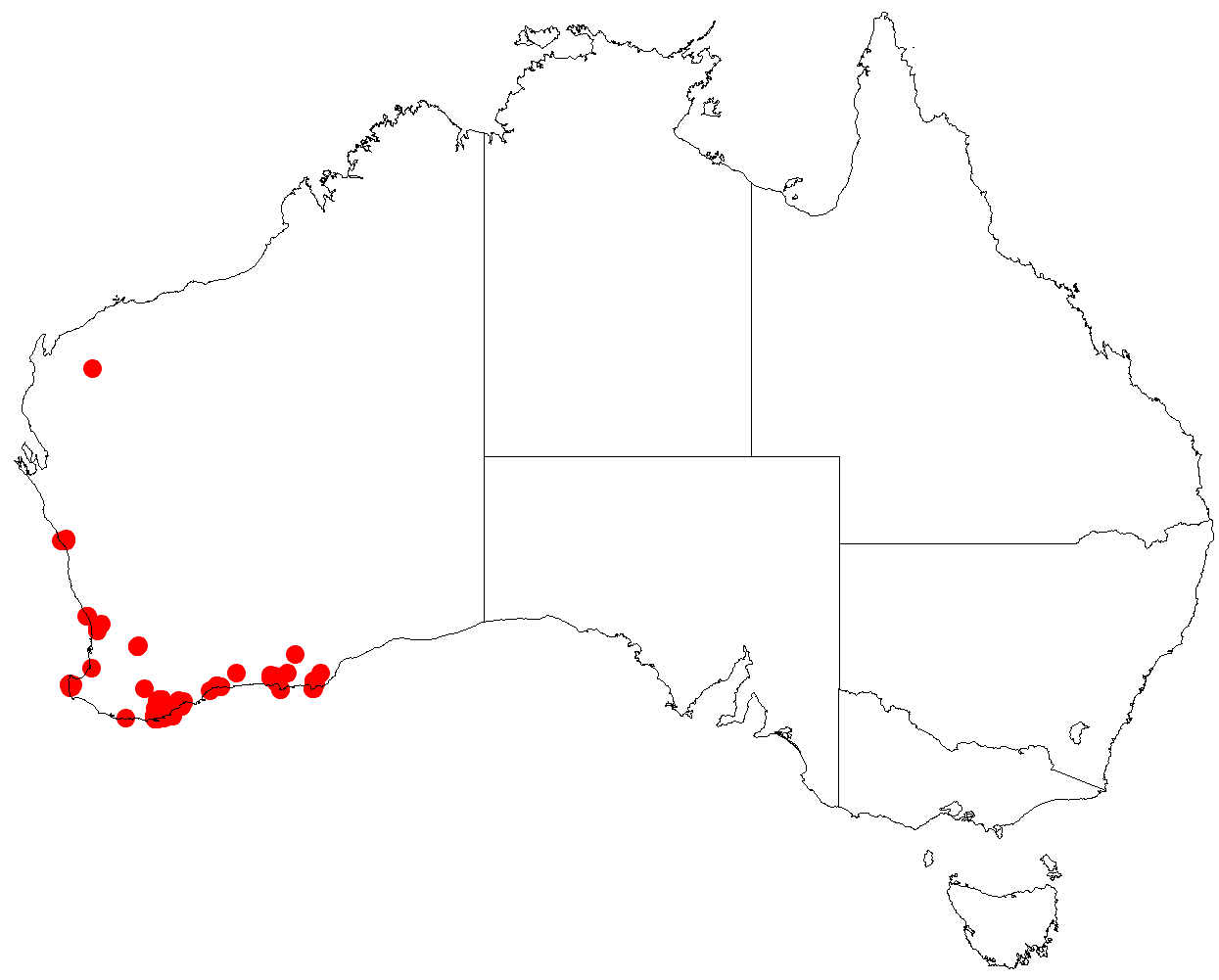
- Occurrence data from AVH

= Leucopogon assimilis =

Species of shrub

Leucopogon assimilis is a species of flowering plant in the family Ericaceae and is endemic to the south of Western Australia. It is an erect, slender shrub with linear or lance-shaped leaves and pink to white, tube-shaped flowers.

== Description ==
Leucopogon assimilis is an erect, slender shrub that typically grows to a height of 0.3–1.5 m (1 ft 0 in – 4 ft 11 in) and has rigid linear or lance-shaped leaves 1.2–2.5 mm (0.047–0.098 in) long. The flowers are arranged in short, dense spikes near the ends of branches or in upper leaf axils with bracts and bracteoles about as long as the sepals. The sepals are 2.0–2.6 mm (0.079–0.102 in) long, the petals white to pink and joined at the base forming a tube 4–6 mm (0.16–0.24 in) long, the lobes slightly longer than the petal tube. Flowering occurs from August to November.

== Taxonomy ==
Leucopogon assimilis was first formally described in 1810 by Robert Brown in Prodromus Florae Novae Hollandiae et Insulae Van Diemen. The specific epithet (assimilis) means "similar".

== Distribution and habitat ==
This leucopogon grows on coastal dunes, ridges and slopes in near-coastal areas of southern Western Australia between Cape Naturaliste and Cape Arid National Park in the Esperance Plains, Jarrah Forest and Mallee bioregions of southern Western Australia.

== Conservation status ==
Leucopogon apiculatus is listed as "not threatened" by the Government of Western Australia Department of Biodiversity, Conservation and Attractions.
