= Ocean Beach, Western Australia =

Locality in the Shire of Denmark, Western Australia

Ocean Beach
- other
- Coordinates: 35.00246°S 117.33226°E
- Country: Australia
- State: Western Australia
- LGA(s): Shire of Denmark
- Location: 365 km (227 mi) SE of Perth; 56 km (35 mi) E of Walpole; 5 km (3.1 mi) SW of Denmark

Government
  - State electorate(s): Warren-Blackwood
  - Federal division(s): O'Connor

Area
  - Total: 42.6 km^{2} (16.4 sq mi)

Population
  - Total(s): 1,014 (SAL 2021)
- Postcode: 6333
Localities around Ocean Beach
Shadforth	Shadforth	Denmark
William Bay	Ocean Beach	Nullaki
	Southern Ocean

Ocean Beach is a coastal locality of the Shire of Denmark in the Great Southern region of Western Australia. The South Coast Highway forms the northern, the Southern Ocean its southern and the Wilson Inlet the eastern border of Ocean Beach. The beach of the same name lies in the east of the locality.

== History ==
Ocean Beach is on the traditional land of the Noongar.

The Mount Hallowell Reserve, located in the centre of Ocean Beach, is listed on the shire's heritage register.

The siding of Mount McLeod on the Elleker to Nornalup railway line was located in the northern-eastern corner of the current locality. A second siding, Hallowell, was located further east, towards Denmark. Both sidings opened in 1929 and closed in 1957.
