= North Walpole =

North Walpole may refer to:

- North Walpole, New Hampshire
- North Walpole, Western Australia
