= Trent, Western Australia =

Locality in the Shire of Denmark, Western Australia

Trent
- Interactive map of Trent
- Coordinates: 34.83628°S 116.90951°E
- Country: Australia
- State: Western Australia
- LGA: Shire of Denmark
- Location: 330 km (210 mi) SE of Perth; 20 km (12 mi) NE of Walpole; 52 km (32 mi) NW of Denmark

Government
  - State electorate: Warren-Blackwood
  - Federal division: O'Connor

Area
  - Total: 376.6 km^{2} (145.4 sq mi)

Population
  - Total: 0 (SAL 2016)
- Postcode: 6333
Localities around Trent
North Walpole	Rocky Gully	Rocky Gully
North Walpole	Trent	Mount Romance
Hazelvale	Bow Bridge	Kentdale

Trent is a rural locality of the Shire of Denmark in the Great Southern region of Western Australia. The Frankland River forms much of the western border of Trent. Most of the locality is covered by national park, with the Mount Frankland South National Park in the south and south-west, the Mount Frankland National Park in the north-west, and the Mount Roe National Park in the east.

Trent is on the traditional land of the Noongar.
