= William Bay =

William Bay may refer to:

- William Bay, Western Australia, a locality of the Shire of Denmark
  - William Bay National Park, a national park in the above locality
- William Bay (Wisconsin legislator), Wisconsin assemblyman and railway union leader
- William Van Ness Bay (1818–1894), U.S. Representative from Missouri
