= Scotsdale, Western Australia =

Locality in the Shire of Denmark, Western Australia

Scotsdale
- other
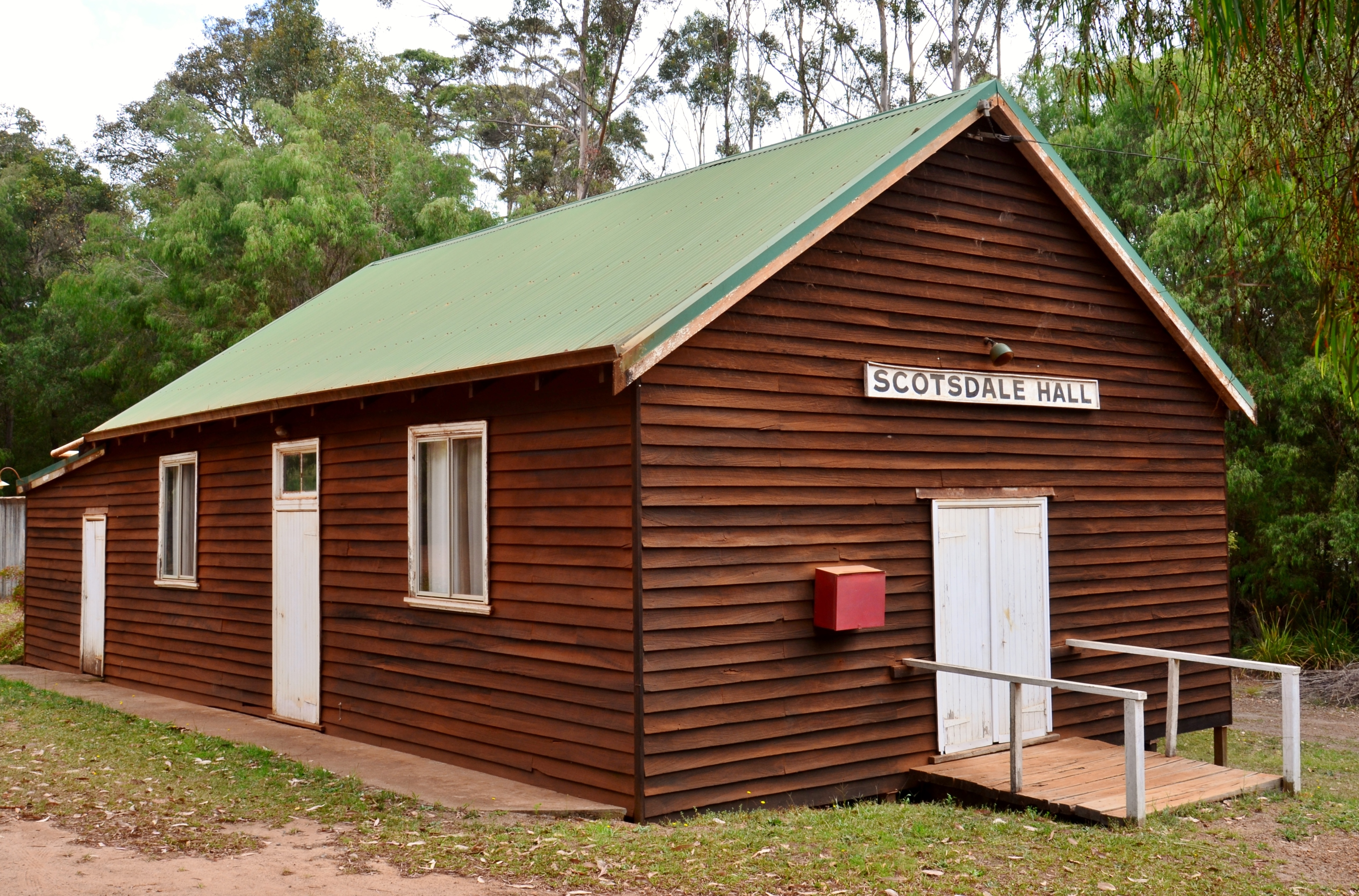
- The heritage listed Scotsdale Hall

- Coordinates: 34.90103°S 117.28441°E
- Country: Australia
- State: Western Australia
- LGA(s): Shire of Denmark
- Location: 353 km (219 mi) SE of Perth; 50 km (31 mi) NE of Walpole; 10 km (6.2 mi) NW of Denmark

Government
  - State electorate(s): Warren-Blackwood
  - Federal division(s): O'Connor

Area
  - Total: 150.7 km^{2} (58.2 sq mi)

Population
  - Total(s): 529 (SAL 2021)
- Postcode: 6333
Localities around Scotsdale
Mount Romance	Mount Lindesay	Hay
Kordabup	Scotsdale	Hay
Shadforth	Shadforth	Denmark

Scotsdale is a rural locality of the Shire of Denmark in the Great Southern region of Western Australia. The Denmark River flows through the east of the locality. The Scotsdale Road and Redmond Road Nature Reserves are located in the south of Scotsdale.

== History ==
Scotsdale is on the traditional land of the Noongar.

Harewood School, located in Scotsdale, is listed on the shire's heritage register. It is a typical one-teacher school building and dates back to 1925. Scotsdale was settled as part of the Group Settlement Scheme, with the school being part of Group Settlements number 58 and 111. The school opened on 2 February 1925 and was intermittently operating until 1940, when it closed permanently. The building was moved to the current location after this.

Also heritage listed are the Scotsdale Hall, the Scotsdale Road Bridge, and the Harewood Forest.

Despite its name, the heritage listed Mount Lindesay School Group 101, another one-teacher school, is located in Scotsdale and not neighbouring Mount Lindesay. It operated intermittently from 1926 to 1943, initially as the Group 101 School, until renamed to Mount Lindesay School in 1940.

== Nature reserves ==
The following nature reserves are located within Scotsdale. Both are located within the Warren bioregion:

- Scotsdale Road Nature Reserve was gazetted on 2 November 1951 and has a size of 0.23 square kilometres (0.089 sq mi).
- Redmond Road Nature Reserve was gazetted on 25 August 1972 and has a size of 0.52 square kilometres (0.20 sq mi).
