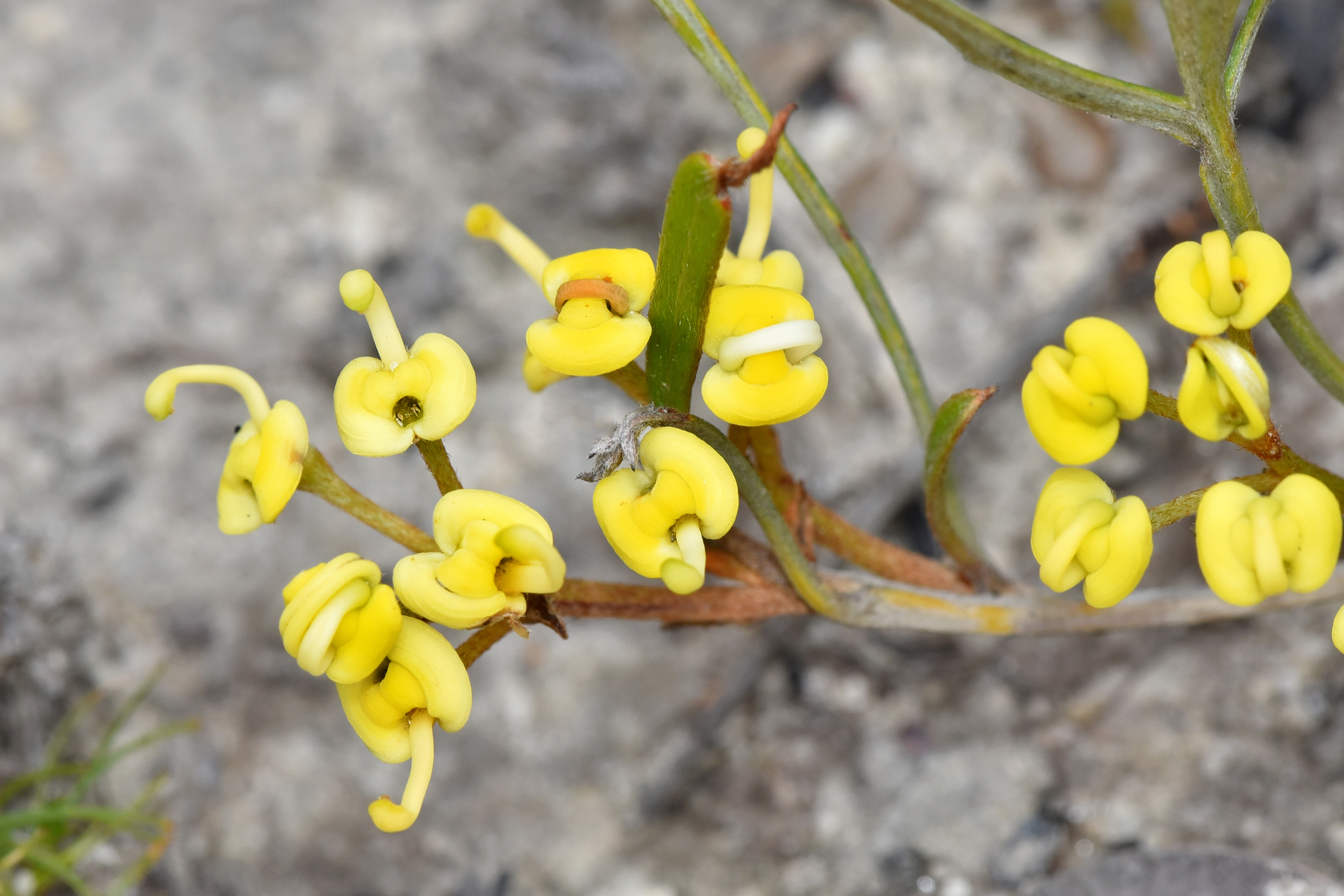

Conservation status
- Data Deficient (IUCN 3.1)

Scientific classification
- Kingdom: Plantae
- Clade: Embryophytes
- Clade: Tracheophytes
- Clade: Spermatophytes
- Clade: Angiosperms
- Clade: Eudicots
- Order: Proteales
- Family: Proteaceae
- Genus: Grevillea
- Species: G. cirsiifolia

Binomial name
- Grevillea cirsiifolia Meisn.

= Grevillea cirsiifolia =

Species of shrub endemic to Western Australia

Grevillea cirsiifolia, commonly known as varied-leaf grevillea, is a species of flowering plant in the family Proteaceae and is endemic to the south-west of Western Australia. It is a prostrate shrub, usually with divided leaves with eight to thirty lobes, and creamy white and bright yellow flowers with a white to pale yellow style.

== Description ==
Grevillea cirsiifolia is a prostrate shrub that typically grows up to 2 m (6 ft 7 in) wide. Its leaves are 70–160 mm (2.8–6.3 in) long and 5–25 mm (0.20–0.98 in) wide in outline, usually pinnatifid to pinnatipartite with eight to thirty linear to almost triangular lobes 12–60 mm (0.47–2.36 in) long and 1.5–5 mm (0.059–0.197 in) wide, or sometimes simple and toothed. The lower surface of the leaves is silky-hairy. The flowers are arranged in groups in leaf axils or on the ends of branchlets on a rachis 25–70 mm (0.98–2.76 in) long and are creamy white outside, brighter yellow inside, the pistil 7–8 mm (0.28–0.31 in) long with a white to pale yellow style. Flowering occurs from October to December and the fruit is a silky-hairy follicle 10–11.5 mm (0.39–0.45 in) long.

== Taxonomy ==
Grevillea cirsiifolia was first formally described in 1848 by Carl Meissner in Johann Georg Christian Lehmann's Plantae Preissianae from specimens collected by James Drummond in the Swan River Colony. The specific epithet (cirsiifolia) means "Cirsium-leaved".

== Distribution and habitat ==
Varied-leaf grevillea grows in woodland, often near winter-wet areas and is found from near Darkan to Mount Lindesay near Denmark in the Avon Wheatbelt, Jarrah Forest, Mallee and Warren biogeographic regions of Western Australia.

== Conservation status ==
This grevillea is listed as not threatened by the Department of Biodiversity, Conservation and Attractions and as data deficient on the IUCN Red List of Threatened Species, meaning there is insufficient information to assign a threat category to the species.

== See also ==
- List of Grevillea species
