= Hay, Western Australia =

Locality in the Shire of Denmark, Western Australia

Hay
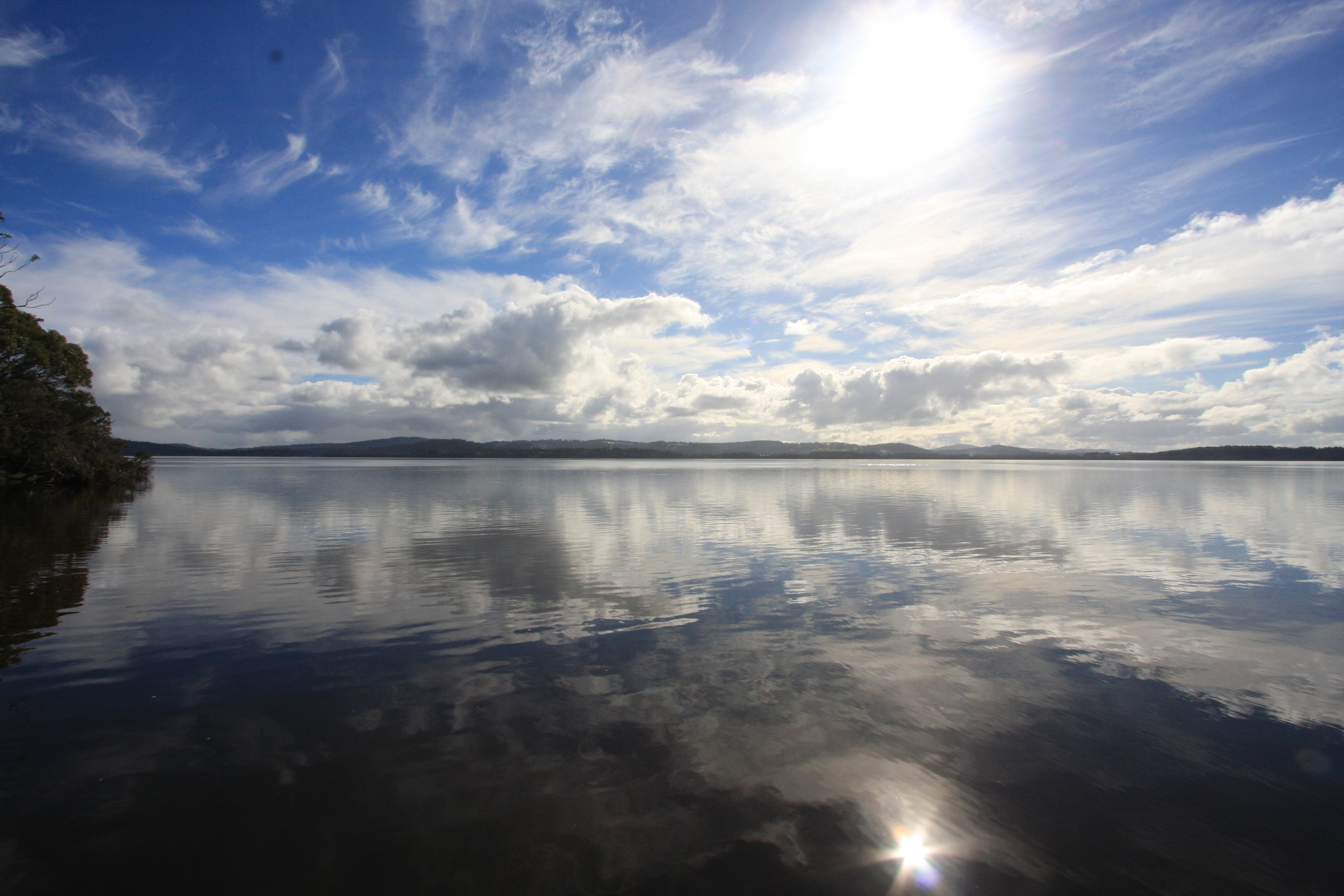
- Wilson Inlet from Nullaki Peninsula, facing north across the inlet towards Hay

- Interactive map of Hay
- Coordinates: 34°57′17″S 117°23′7″E
- Country: Australia
- State: Western Australia
- LGA: Shire of Denmark
- Location: 419.9 km (260.9 mi) S of Perth; 4.7 km (2.9 mi) W of Denmark

Government
  - State electorate: Warren-Blackwood
  - Federal division: O'Connor

Area
  - Total: 132.8 km^{2} (51.3 sq mi)

Population
  - Total: 493 (2021)
  - Density: 3.712/km^{2} (9.615/sq mi)
- Postcode: 6333
Localities around Hay
Mount Lindesay	Mount Lindesay	Redmond West
Scotsdale	Hay	Redmond West
Denmark	Nullaki	Youngs Siding

Hay is a locality in the Shire of Denmark, Great Southern region of Western Australia. The South Coast Highway passes through the locality from east to west. the Hay River forms its eastern boundary while the southern shore of the Wilson Inlet forms its southern border. The Mount Lindesay National Park extends into the far north of Hay while the McIntosh Road and Rudyard Beach Nature Reserves are located in its south.

Hay was a stopping place on the Albany to Denmark railway line, which was extended to Nornalup in 1929 and closed down in 1957.

== Demographics ==
As of the 2021 Australian census, 493 people resided in Hay, up from 332 in the 2016 census. The median age of persons in Hay was 51 years. There were more males than females, with 51.8% of the population male and 48.2% female. The average household size was 2.4 people per household.

== Nature reserves ==
The following nature reserves are located within Hay. Both are located within the Warren bioregion:

- McIntosh Road Nature Reserve was gazetted on 21 April 1950 and has a size of 0.28 square kilometres (0.11 mi^{2}).
- Rudyard Beach Nature Reserve was gazetted on 18 August 1950 and has a size of 0.38 square kilometres (0.15 mi^{2}).
