= Ocean Beach (Western Australia) =

Beach in Western Australia

Coordinates: 35°1′S 117°19′E

Ocean Beach is a tourist attraction located about 5 kilometres (3 mi) south of the town of Denmark, in the locality of Ocean Beach, Western Australia.

The beach is part of Ratcliffe Bay and is surrounded to the east by the Nullaki Peninsula and a smaller granite headland, Wilson Head, to the east. Wilson Inlet is contained by a semi-permanent sandbar that forms part of Ocean Beach although a bar channel often exists which moves seasonally along the beach.

The beach is patrolled during the summer months from December to April and a lifeguard is on duty for the summer holidays (mid-December to early February). Swimming between the flags at the base of the Surf Life Saving Club is recommended.

In 1993, four Gray's beaked whales (also called Scamperdown whales or Mesoplodon grayi) were stranded on the beach, three were eventually returned to sea but the last one died.

In 2024, a malnourished emperor penguin was found on the beach, having traveled over 3,400 kilometers from the Antarctic coast. It marked the first recorded instance of an emperor penguin reaching Australia and the furthest north the species has been observed.
