= Nornalup, Western Australia =

Locality in the Shire of Denmark, Western Australia

Nornalup
- Town
- Interactive map of Nornalup
- Coordinates: 34.99°S 116.82°E
- Country: Australia
- State: Western Australia
- LGA: Shire of Denmark
- Location: 432 km (268 mi) south south east of Perth; 8 km (5.0 mi) east of Walpole; 49 km (30 mi) west of Denmark

Government
  - State electorate: Warren-Blackwood
  - Federal division: O'Connor

Area
  - Total: 46.9 km^{2} (18.1 sq mi)
- Elevation: 18 m (59 ft)

Population
  - Total: 89 (SAL 2021)
- Postcode: 6333
Localities around Nornalup
Walpole	Hazelvale	Tingledale
Walpole	Nornalup	Bow Bridge
Broke	Southern Ocean	Peaceful Bay

Nornalup is a small town and locality in the Shire of Denmark in the Great Southern region of Western Australia. The town is located along the South Coast Highway, on the banks of the Frankland River and the shore of the Southern Ocean. Much of the locality, including its entire coast, is taken up by the Walpole-Nornalup National Park.

== History ==
The name derives from the local indigenous language, and means 'place of the black snake'. It is composed of Norne, meaning 'black snake' (that is, tiger snake); and up, meaning 'place of'. The area attracts considerable numbers of tiger snakes due to its proximity to the river and wetlands, though fewer now than in the past. Anecdotal evidence from early settlers mentions uncomfortably large numbers of these highly venomous and aggressive reptiles, particularly during spring and early summer.

From 1929 to the official closure of the line in 1957, Nornalup was the western terminus of the Elleker to Nornalup railway line.

Nornalup was the original name of Walpole, which led to some confusion as the townsite and the terminus of the railway line were a considerable distance apart. In 1934, Walpole received its current name. The current gazetted townsite of Nornalup is in the west of the locality, just north-west of where the South Coast Highway crosses the Frankland River.
