= North Walpole, Western Australia =

Locality in the Shire of Manjimup, Western Australia

North Walpole
- Interactive map of North Walpole
- Coordinates: 34.64286°S 116.62469°E
- Country: Australia
- State: Western Australia
- LGA: Shire of Manjimup
- Location: 340 km (210 mi) from Perth; 93 km (58 mi) from Manjimup; 7 km (4.3 mi) from Walpole

Government
  - State electorate: Warren-Blackwood
  - Federal division: O'Connor

Area
  - Total: 1,095.4 km^{2} (422.9 sq mi)

Population
  - Total: 108 (SAL 2021)
- Postcode: 6398
Localities around North Walpole
| Lake Muir | Lake Muir | Rocky Gully |
| Shannon | North Walpole | Trent |
| Broke | Walpole | Hazelvale |

North Walpole is a rural locality of the Shire of Manjimup in the South West region of Western Australia. The South Western Highway forms the western and southern border of the locality, while the Frankland River forms its eastern boundary. North Walpole contains all of Mount Frankland North National Park and a substantial part of both the Mount Frankland National Park and Mount Frankland South National Park. A small section of the Lake Muir National Park is also located within the north of North Walpole, a section of the Walpole-Nornalup National Park is located within the south-west, and a section of the Mount Roe National Park in the north-east of the locality.

North Walpole is on the traditional lands of the Mineng people of the Noongar nation.
