= Shire of Denmark =

Coordinates: 34°57′36″S 117°21′11″E

- Local government area
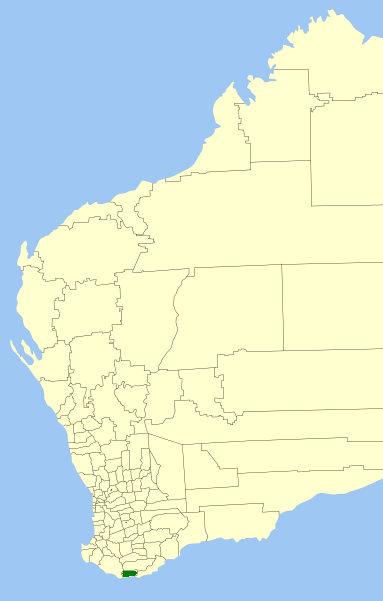
- Location in Western Australia

- Interactive map of Shire of Denmark
- Country: Australia
- State: Western Australia
- Region: Great Southern
- Established: 1911
- Council seat: Denmark

Government
  - Shire President: Aaron Wiggins
  - State electorate: Warren-Blackwood
  - Federal division: O'Connor

Area
  - Total: 1,860.1 km^{2} (718.2 sq mi)

Population
  - Total: 6,310 (LGA 2021)
- Website: Shire of Denmark
LGAs around Shire of Denmark
Manjimup	Plantagenet	Plantagenet
Manjimup	Shire of Denmark	Albany
Southern Ocean	Southern Ocean	Southern Ocean

The Shire of Denmark is a local government area in the Great Southern region of Western Australia, about 55 kilometres (34 mi) west of Albany and about 420 kilometres (261 mi) south-southeast of the state capital, Perth. The Shire of Denmark covers an area of 1,860 square kilometres (718 sq mi), and its seat of government is located in the townsite and locality of Denmark.

== History ==
The Denmark Road District was gazetted on 22 September 1911. On 1 July 1961, the district became a shire following the passing of the Local Government Act 1960, which reformed all remaining road districts into shires.

== Indigenous people ==
The Shire of Denmark, according to its own website, is located on the traditional land of the Bibulman and Mineng people of the Noongar nation. The Mineng's traditional lands cover the majority of the shire while the Bibulman's traditional lands are to the west and, according to other sources, do not extend into the Shire of Denmark.

== Wards ==
The Shire of Denmark is divided into three wards with a varying number of councillors:

- Scotsdale/Shadforth Ward (four councillors)
- Town Ward (three councillors)
- Kent/Nornalup Ward (two councillors)

== Townsites ==
- Denmark (extended to include residential portions of Ocean Beach on 5 July 2016)
- Nornalup (created on 5 July 2016)
- Peaceful Bay (created on 5 July 2016)

== Towns and localities ==
The towns and localities of the Shire of Denmark with population and size figures based on the most recent Australian census:

Locality	Population	Area	Map
Bow Bridge	75 (SAL 2021)	112.9 km^{2} (43.6 sq mi)	
Denmark	2,691 (SAL 2021)	17.5 km^{2} (6.8 sq mi)	
Hay	493 (SAL 2021)	132.8 km^{2} (51.3 sq mi)	
Hazelvale	83 (SAL 2021)	53.1 km^{2} (20.5 sq mi)	
Kentdale	118 (SAL 2021)	65.8 km^{2} (25.4 sq mi)	
Kordabup	141 (SAL 2021)	86 km^{2} (33 sq mi)	
Mount Lindesay	0 (SAL 2016)	267 km^{2} (103 sq mi)	
Mount Romance	0 (SAL 2016)	306.6 km^{2} (118.4 sq mi)	
Nornalup	89 (SAL 2021)	46.9 km^{2} (18.1 sq mi)	
Ocean Beach	1,014 (SAL 2021)	42.6 km^{2} (16.4 sq mi)	
Parryville	70 (SAL 2021)	79.9 km^{2} (30.8 sq mi)	
Peaceful Bay	71 (SAL 2021)	25.5 km^{2} (9.8 sq mi)	
Scotsdale	529 (SAL 2021)	150.7 km^{2} (58.2 sq mi)	
Shadforth	715 (SAL 2021)	45.3 km^{2} (17.5 sq mi)	
Tingledale	57 (SAL 2021)	51.5 km^{2} (19.9 sq mi)	
Trent	0 (SAL 2016)	376.6 km^{2} (145.4 sq mi)	
William Bay	164 (SAL 2021)	49.2 km^{2} (19.0 sq mi)	

== Heritage-listed places ==
As of 2023, 141 places are heritage-listed in the Shire of Denmark, of which three are on the State Register of Heritage Places.
