= South Coast Highway =

Highway in Western Australia

South Coast Highway Western Australia
- Map of south-west Western Australia with South Coast Highway highlighted in red

General information
- Type: Highway
- Length: 592 km (368 mi)
- Route number(s): National Route 1

Major junctions
- West end: South Western Highway (National Route 1), Walpole
- Albany Highway (State Route 30); Newdegate–Ravensthorpe Road (State Route 40); Hopetoun-Ravensthorpe Road
- East end: Coolgardie–Esperance Highway (National Route 1), Esperance

Location(s)
- Major settlements: Albany, Manypeaks, Jerramungup, Ravensthorpe

Highway system
- Highways in Australia; National Highway • Freeways in Australia; Highways in Western Australia

South Coast Highway is a Western Australian highway. It is a part of the Highway 1 network.

With a length of 592 kilometres (368 mi), it runs from Esperance to Walpole roughly in parallel to Western Australia's south coast. Even then the journey is pretty much inland.

Approximately 40 kilometres (25 mi) from Ravensthorpe lies the Fitzgerald River National Park with beaches, coastal and mountain walking trails and wildflowers. There are three more national parks with abundant wildlife along the journey to Walpole. Albany is a former whaling town and is rich in history.

Beyond Walpole, Highway 1 continues as South Western Highway to Perth. Beyond Esperance, Highway 1 continues as Coolgardie–Esperance Highway to Norseman.

== Towns ==
The highway passes through the following towns from East to West:

- Esperance
- Ravensthorpe
- Boxwood Hill
- Manypeaks
- Albany
- Denmark
- Walpole

== Major intersections ==
=== Walpole to Albany Highway ===
LGA	Location	km	mi	Destinations	Notes
Manjimup	Walpole	0	0.0	Vista Street	Western terminus. Continues as South Western Highway (National Route 1) westwards.
Denmark	Denmark	65	40	Ocean Beach Road – Ocean Beach	
Denmark	Scotsdale-Hay boundary	68	42	Denmark-Mount Barker Road – Denbarker, Mount Barker	
Albany	Youngs Siding	83	52	Lower Denmark Road – Torbay, Elleker, Albany	Roundabout intersection
Albany	McKail-Gledhow-Marbelup tripoint	111	69	Menang Drive (State Route 103) – Perth, Esperance, Port Albany,	Albany Ring Road
Albany	Lockyer–Orana boundary	116	72	Albany Highway (State Route 30) north – Albany, Mount Barker, Kojonup, Perth	Eastern terminus of western section. No right turn from Albany Highway southbound
1.000 mi = 1.609 km; 1.000 km = 0.621 mi: Incomplete access; Note: Intersections with minor local roads are not shown

=== Chester Pass Road to Esperance ===
LGA	Location	km	mi	Destinations	Notes
Albany	King River	0	0.0	Chester Pass Road (National Route 1 southwest) – Lake Grace, Borden, Albany	Eastern terminus of western section at t-junction. South Coast to Chester Pass southbound free-flowing. Access to Stirling Range National Park
Albany	Cheynes-Manypeaks boundary	36	22	Cheyne Road	Access to Cheynes Beach and Waychinicup National Park
Jerramungup	Boxwood Hill	107	66	Borden-Bremer Bay Road – Borden, Bremer Bay	
Jerramungup	Gairdner	135	84	Gairdner South Road – Bremer Bay	
Jerramungup	Jerramungup	166	103	Gnowangerup-Jerramungup Road – Ongerup, Gnowangerup, Broomehill	Through traffic must turn at t-junction
Ravensthorpe	Ravensthorpe	277	172	Newdegate-Ravensthorpe Road (State Route 40) north – Lake King, Lake Grace, Hyden, Perth	Newdegate-Ravensthorpe to South Coast eastbound free-flowing.
Ravensthorpe	Ravensthorpe	281	175	Hopetoun-Ravensthorpe Road southbound – Hopetoun / Heavy vehicle bypass northbound.	Roundabout.
Esperance	Dalyup	437	272	Dalyup-Gibson Road – Gibson	
Esperance	Chadwick	464	288	Harbour Road (National Route 1 north) – Esperance, Norseman, Kalgoorlie	Eastern terminus at t-junction
1.000 mi = 1.609 km; 1.000 km = 0.621 mi Note: Intersections with minor local roads are not shown

== See also ==
- Highways in Australia
- List of highways in Western Australia
