= Nornalup railway line =

Former railway line in Western Australia

Elleker to Nornalup railway line
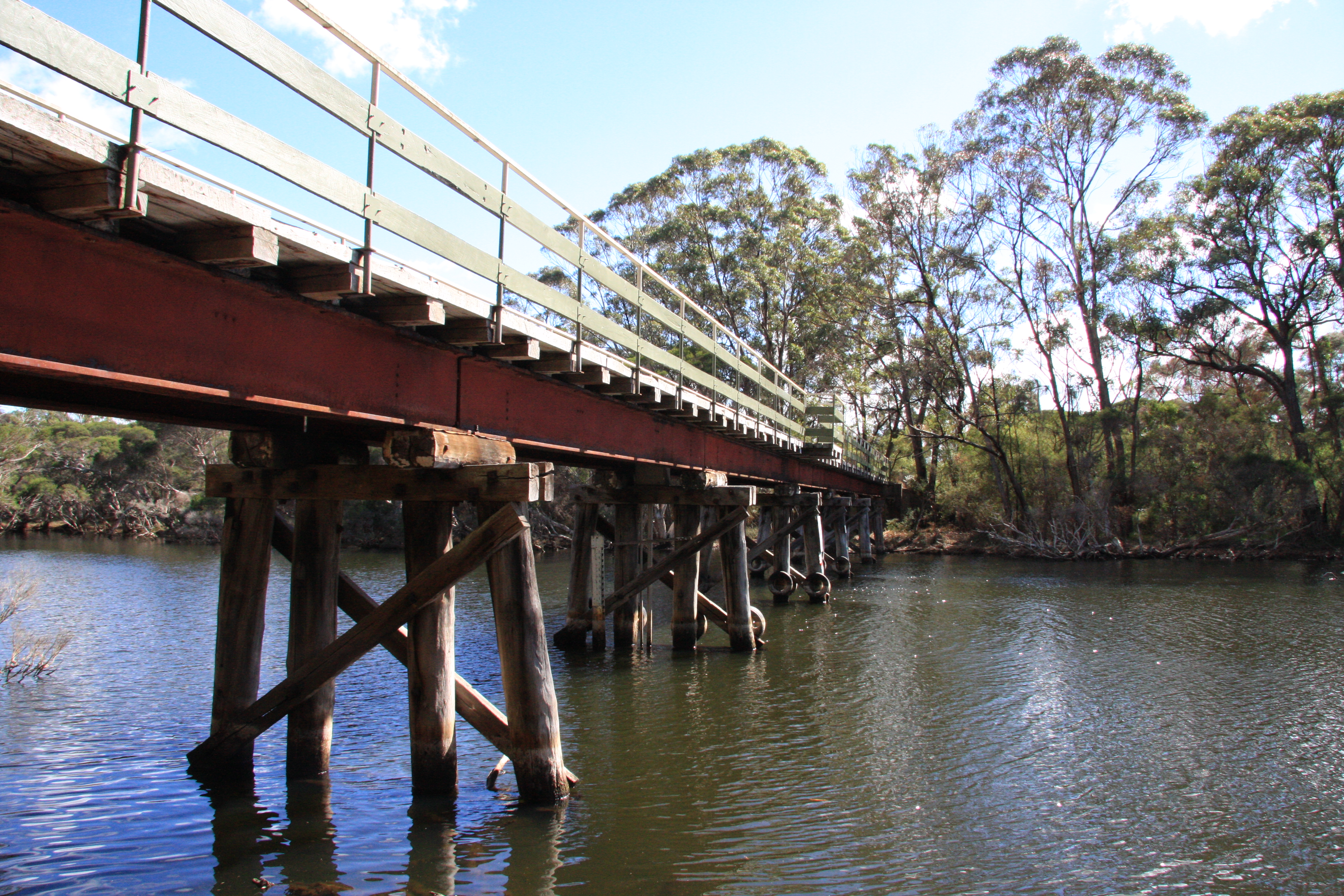
- The railway bridge over the Denmark River in Denmark

Overview
- Owner: Government of Western Australia
- Locale: Great Southern, Western Australia
- Termini: Elleker; Nornalup

Service
- Operator: Western Australian Government Railways

History
- Commenced: 1889
- Opened: 11 June 1929
- Closed: 30 September 1957

Technical
- Line length: 97 km (60 mi)
- Track gauge: 1,067 mm (3 ft 6 in)
- Elleker to Nornalup railway line Main locations

The Elleker to Nornalup railway line was a Western Australian Government Railways operated railway line in the Great Southern region of Western Australia, connecting Elleker to Nornalup via Denmark. The line was 97 kilometres (60 mi) long and, at Elleker, connected to the Great Southern Railway.

The railway was constructed during two distinct time periods: as the Albany to Denmark railway line by the Millars Karri and Jarrah Forests Limited, which opened in 1889 and was sold to the Western Australian government in 1907; and the Denmark to Nornalup extension, which opened in 1929. The railway line was closed in 1957.

== History ==
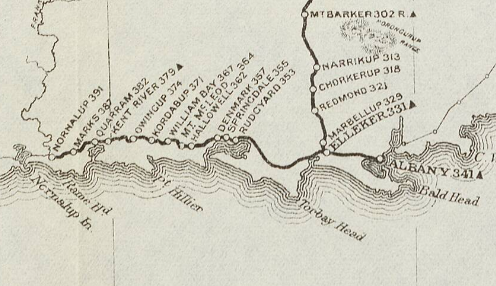
The railway line from Elleker to Nornalup in 1934 (distances in miles)

The construction of the Beverley to Albany railway, the Great Southern Railway, was authorised in 1886 and completed in June 1889, constructed by C&E Millar. Following this, Charles and Edwin Millar received permission to build a railway line from Elleker to Denmark, where they operated a timber mill. Construction of this line began in November 1889 and was completed a year later, in November 1890. This railway line became known as the Albany to Denmark railway line or Denmark branch railway.

Elleker, the eastern terminus of the line and junction to the Great Southern Railway, was originally named Lakeside. In 1908, Lakeside was changed to Torbay Junction to prevent confusion with another place of the same name near Kalgoorlie. Additionally, the railway station was already known as Torbay Junction. The name Ualungup was also considered for the location but, in 1921, the name Elleker was chosen. In 1904, the closure of the line from Torbay Junction to Denmark, then still in private hands, was a real possibility and government intervention was called for. The Western Australian government purchased the railway line from the Millars Karri and Jarrah Company (1902) Limited by resolution of the Legislative Assembly No. 25 on 29 November 1907 and the Legislative Council No. 28 on 19 December 1907. The government declared the railway opened as a Government Railway in Government Gazette No. 18 on 3 April 1908.

The Albany–Denmark Railway Extension Act 1923, an act by the Parliament of Western Australia granted assent on 22 February 1923, authorised the construction of the extension of the railway line from Denmark to Nornalup, a 56 kilometres (35 mi) extension.

The construction of the expansion was awarded to the Western Australian Public Works Department on 5 July 1926 and the line was opened on 11 June 1929.

By 1938, the closure of the railway line was already contemplated but not carried out, with the argument presented for the railway line being that the necessary upgrades to the roads in the region would be more expensive than the operation of the line. In 1953 the Minister for Railways stated that the railway was not due for closure, and the potential extension between Northcliffe and Nornalup was not considered.

In 1954, the state government of Western Australia had compiled a list of loss-making railway operations, of which the Elleker to Nornalup line was one, having had a total expenditure of almost eight times its earnings in the financial year to June 1953, £A 64,387 expenditure versus earnings of £A 8,515. By 1957, the closure of the railway line had become imminent, and the line closed on 30 September 1957.

The Railways (Cue–Big Bell and other Railways) Discontinuance Act 1960, assented to on 12 December 1960, authorised the official closure of 13 railway lines in Western Australia, among them the Elleker to Nornalup one.

== Legacy ==
The Denmark to Nornalup section of the former railway line is now on the Shire of Denmark's heritage list, which also includes the railway bridge over the Denmark River, the ashpit and the turntable in Denmark. The former Denmark railway station and the site of the Hay River railway bridge are also on the shire's heritage list.

The Denmark to Nornalup section of the former railway is now a 61-kilometre (38 mi) long rail heritage trail, as is the shorter 8-kilometre (5.0 mi) section from Torbay to Elleker.
