= Denmark, Western Australia =

Coastal town in Western Australia

Denmark
- Town
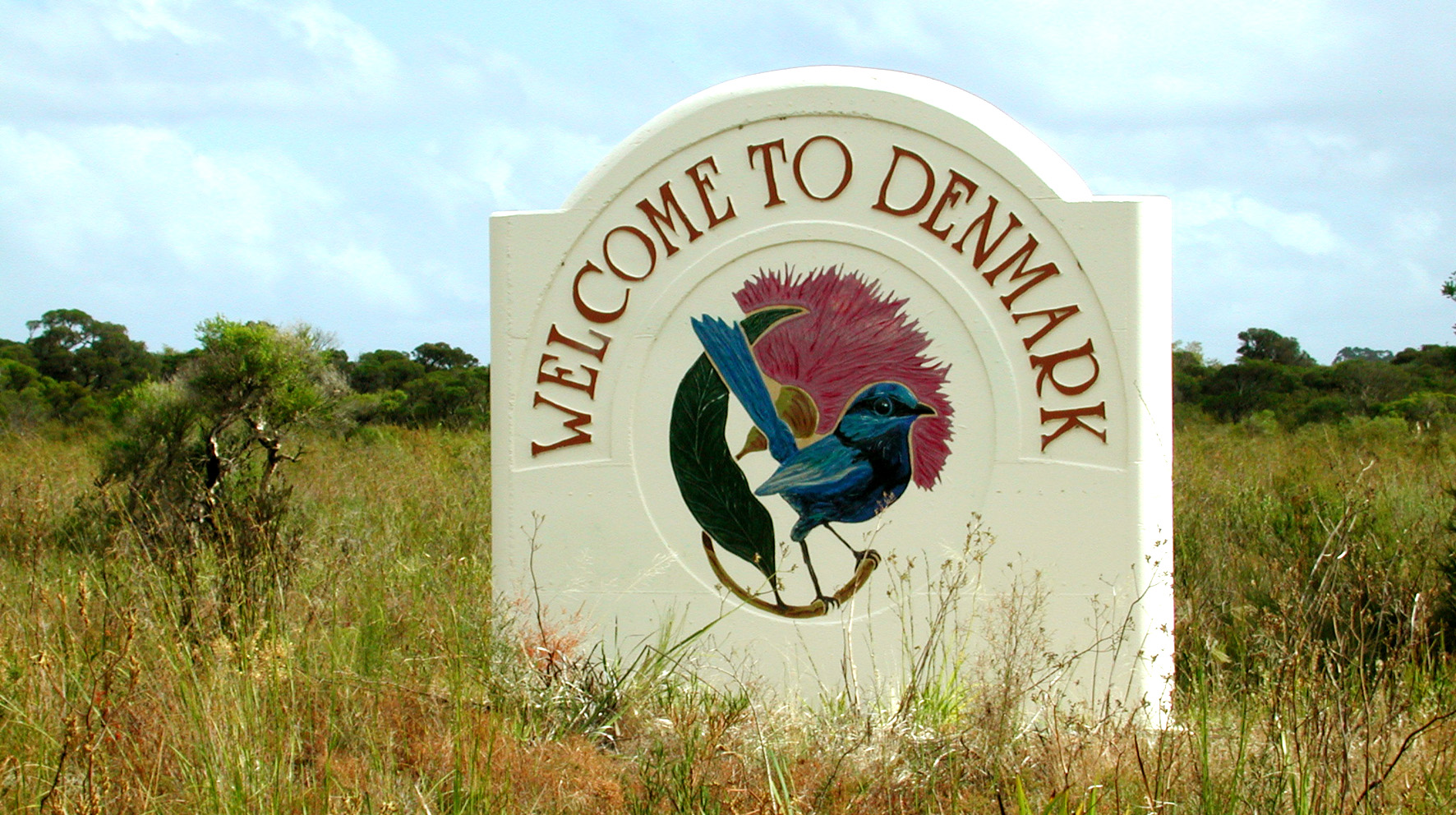
- Denmark, Western Australia

- Interactive map of Denmark
- Coordinates: 34°57′36″S 117°21′11″E
- Country: Australia
- State: Western Australia
- LGA: Shire of Denmark
- Established: 1895

Government
  - State electorate: Warren-Blackwood
  - Federal division: O'Connor

Area
  - Total: 17.5 km^{2} (6.8 sq mi)

Population
  - Total: 2,944 (UCL 2021)
- Postcode: 6333
- Mean max temp: 20.5 °C (68.9 °F)
- Mean min temp: 9.8 °C (49.6 °F)
- Annual rainfall: 998.4 mm (39.31 in)
Localities around Denmark
Scotsdale	Scotsdale	Scotsdale
Shadforth	Denmark	Hay
Ocean Beach	Nullaki	Nullaki

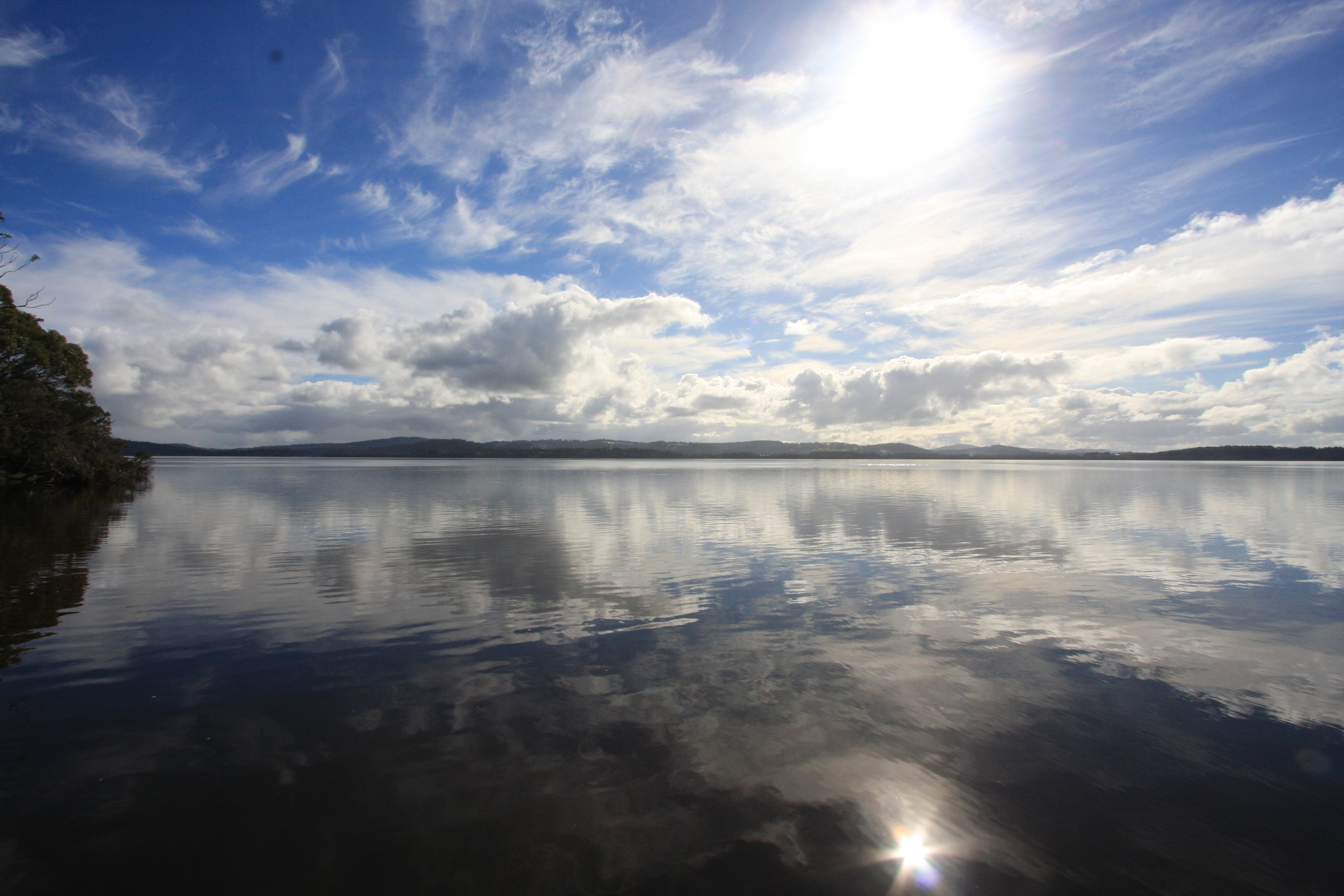
Wilson Inlet southern shore

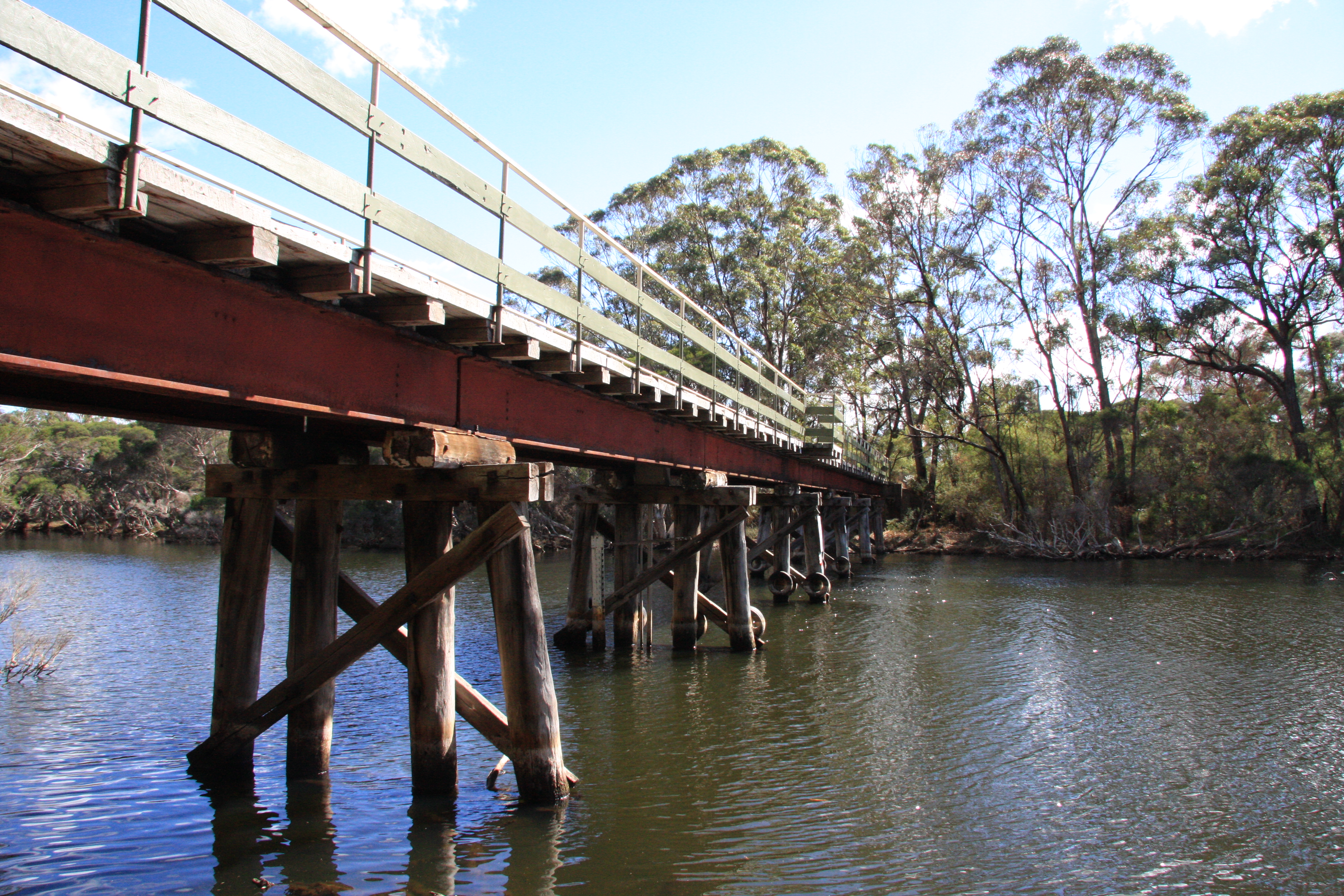
Heritage Rail Bridge (now a footbridge) spanning the Denmark River

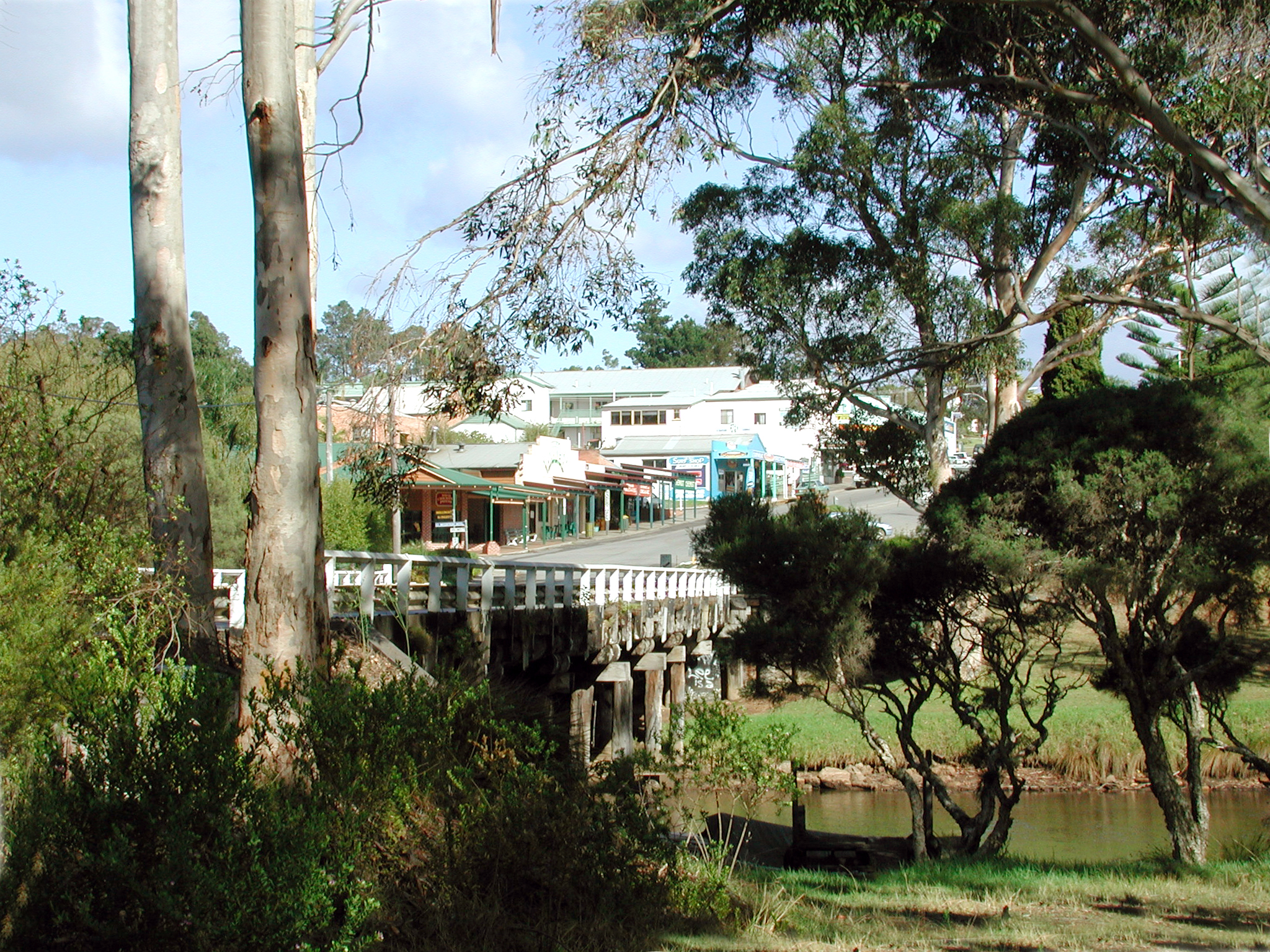
Denmark River and Bridge

Denmark is a coastal town located on Wilson Inlet in the Great Southern region of Western Australia, 423 kilometres (263 mi) south-south-east of the state capital of Perth. At the 2016 census, Denmark had a population of 2,558; however, the population can be several times the base population during tourist seasons.

== History ==
't Landt van de Leeuwin (Leeuwin's Land) was the original Dutch name for the area from King George Sound to the Swan River. It was named after the Dutch East Indiaman Leeuwin, which sighted the coast from Hamelin Bay to Point D'Entrecasteaux in 1622. The coastline of the Denmark area was observed in 1627 by the Dutchman François Thijssen, captain of the ship 't Gulden Zeepaert (The Golden Seahorse), who sailed to the east as far as Ceduna in South Australia and back. Captain Thijssen had seen the south coast of Australia and charted about 1,800 kilometres (1,100 mi) of it between Cape Leeuwin and the Nuyts Archipelago.

Two centuries later, when the first Europeans entered the lands around the present Denmark, the area was inhabited by the Noongar. Aboriginal Australians called the river and the inlet Kwoorabup, which means "place of the black wallaby" (kwoor).

The Denmark River was given its modern name in December 1829 by naval ship's surgeon Thomas Braidwood Wilson after his mentor, naval surgeon Alexander Denmark, Physician of the Fleet, Resident Physician at the Royal Hospital Haslar, and past-Physician to the Mediterranean Fleet. Wilson found the river while exploring the area in company with the Noongar Mokare from King George Sound, John Kent (officer in charge of the Commissariat at Frederick Town, King George Sound), two convicts and Private William Gough of the 39th Regiment, while his ship the Governor Phillip was being repaired at King George Sound.

In August 1895 C & E Millar completed the purchase of 8,100 hectares (20,000 acres) of freehold timber country at Denmark River, known as the Denmark Estate, and in October 1895, after a stock exchange listing in London to raise the capital, Millars Karri and Jarrah Forests Limited commenced a railway extension from Torbay to Denmark River. The formation was completed and the first timber mill constructed at Denmark timber station in December 1895. A post office and savings bank was opened on 30 August 1897. Millars built its third mill in 1898 and by 1900 there were 800 workers and their families resident at Denmark, for a total population of 2,000.

Resource depletion soon resulted in a total collapse of the local karri timber industry. By May 1903, with the closure of No 1 Mill, the Denmark milling industry was in decline. On 30 September 1904 Millars' Denmark operation was closed down. In 1908 Millars sold the Denmark Estate and the Elleker-Denmark railway to the state government. A townsite was surveyed and provision made for a school site, recreation reserves and town hall site.

In 1911 the Denmark Ward of the Albany Roads Board was excised to form the Denmark Roads Board.

The population declined dramatically, and revived only with the introduction of the Group Settlement Scheme in the 1920s. Small farms of 40 hectares (99 acres) were cleared from woodland to create pasture for cattle, dairying and orcharding, mainly apples. Conditions were often poor and some of the small farmers could hardly survive. They worked in one of the timber mills operating around the middle of the 20th century.

Tourism started when American soldiers, stationed in Albany during World War II, made outings to Denmark. After the war, Denmark became a popular holiday destination for Western Australians.

By the 1960s the population had increased to 1,500 and Denmark was becoming attractive to alternative life-stylers and early retirees. Intensive agriculturists such as wine growers had discovered the value of the rich karri loam for their vineyards. Riesling and Chardonnay were the first grapes grown on Denmark soil, soon followed by other varieties. Within 50 years the area became a wine subregion of critical acclaim, as part of the Great Southern Wine Region. The first winery, Tinglewood, opened in 1976, and by 2008, over twenty vineyards had been established around Denmark.

=== WAGR rail service ===
Millars' Elleker-Torbay-Denmark railway line closed on 31 May 1905. During negotiations over the sale of the railway line the State leased the line and WAGR rail services began on 3 May 1907. In 1908 Millars sold the railway to the state government. Line extension works beyond Denmark were started in 1926 and on 11 June 1929 the first passenger service ran to Nornalup. The Nornalup-Denmark-Torbay-Elleker rail service was permanently shut down on 30 September 1957 and the rails were lifted in 1963.

== Climate ==
Denmark has a Mediterranean climate (Csb) with warm, dry summers and mild, wet winters.

Climate data for Denmark, Western Australia
Month	Jan	Feb	Mar	Apr	May	Jun	Jul	Aug	Sep	Oct	Nov	Dec	Year
Record high °C (°F)	43.9 (111.0)	40.5 (104.9)	40.3 (104.5)	37.2 (99.0)	30.6 (87.1)	26.1 (79.0)	22.5 (72.5)	25.0 (77.0)	27.0 (80.6)	32.8 (91.0)	36.0 (96.8)	39.5 (103.1)	43.9 (111.0)
Mean daily maximum °C (°F)	25.9 (78.6)	25.3 (77.5)	24.5 (76.1)	21.6 (70.9)	19.0 (66.2)	16.8 (62.2)	16.1 (61.0)	16.4 (61.5)	17.5 (63.5)	19.1 (66.4)	21.0 (69.8)	23.2 (73.8)	20.5 (68.9)
Mean daily minimum °C (°F)	13.0 (55.4)	13.5 (56.3)	12.2 (54.0)	10.4 (50.7)	8.9 (48.0)	7.6 (45.7)	6.9 (44.4)	6.9 (44.4)	7.5 (45.5)	8.7 (47.7)	10.5 (50.9)	11.8 (53.2)	9.8 (49.6)
Record low °C (°F)	4.5 (40.1)	4.4 (39.9)	2.0 (35.6)	2.0 (35.6)	0.0 (32.0)	−1.4 (29.5)	−0.3 (31.5)	−1.7 (28.9)	−0.4 (31.3)	1.5 (34.7)	2.5 (36.5)	2.8 (37.0)	−1.7 (28.9)
Average rainfall mm (inches)	22.3 (0.88)	27.3 (1.07)	38.1 (1.50)	81.9 (3.22)	124.7 (4.91)	143.0 (5.63)	158.9 (6.26)	127.8 (5.03)	99.1 (3.90)	92.1 (3.63)	53.0 (2.09)	32.0 (1.26)	995.9 (39.21)
Average rainy days (≥ 0.2 mm)	7.3	8.5	10.3	15.0	19.4	21.6	23.3	22.0	19.6	17.1	13.1	9.7	186.9
Mean monthly sunshine hours	257.3	198.8	192.2	144.0	139.5	126.0	137.8	155.0	159.0	198.4	195.0	251.1	2,154.1
Source: Bureau of Meteorology

== Demographics ==
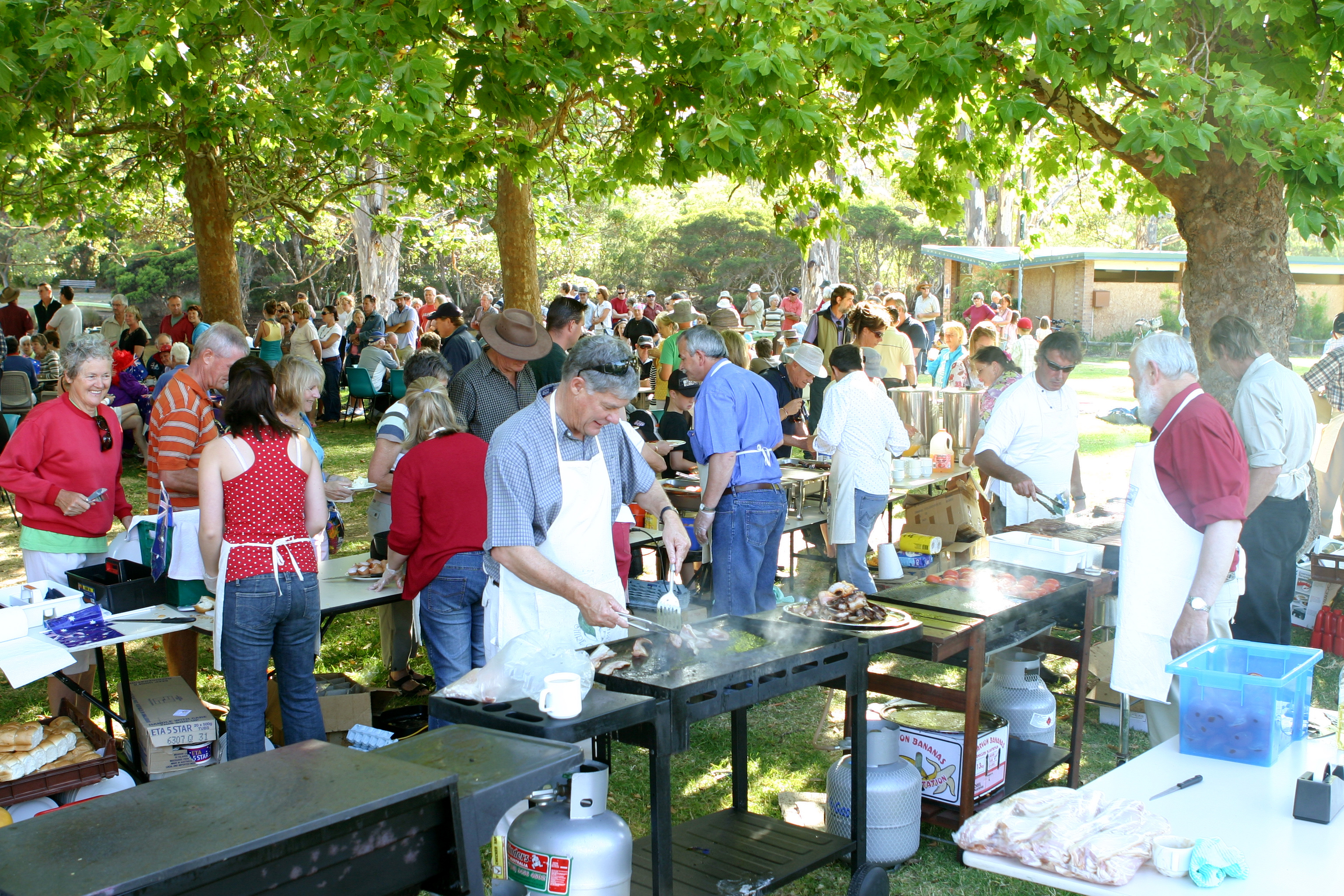
Australia Day in the Berridge Park on the Denmark River bank

According to the 2016 census, Denmark had a population of 2,558. Of these, 67.9% were Australian-born, 11.8% were born in England or Scotland, 2.3% were born in New Zealand and 1.2% were born in South Africa. 2.1% identified as Aboriginal.

The demography fluctuates depending on tourism; with the town at full capacity during school holidays and throughout the summer. The many holiday houses kept in Denmark usually belong to wealthy Perth-based families. During the census (Tuesday 9 August) 19.6% of dwellings were unoccupied (national average 11.2%).

== Facilities ==
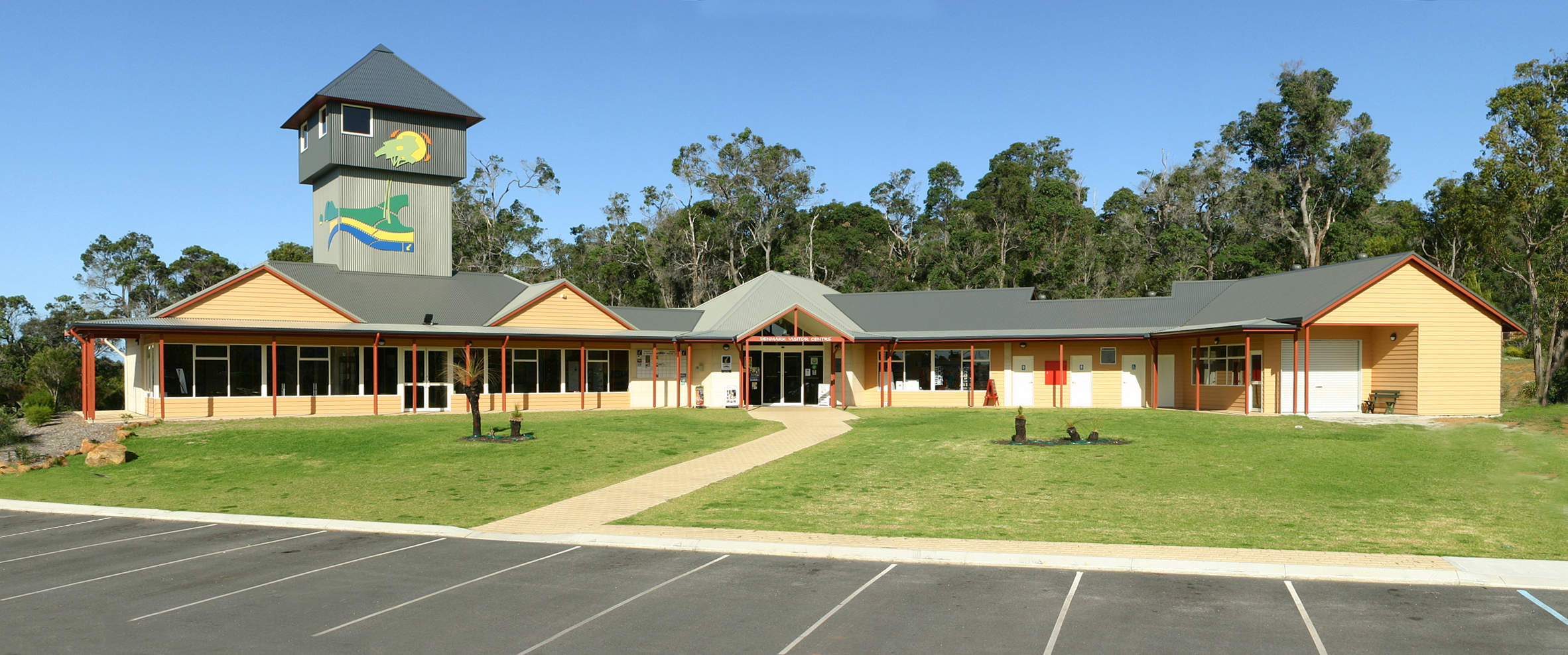
Denmark Visitor Centre

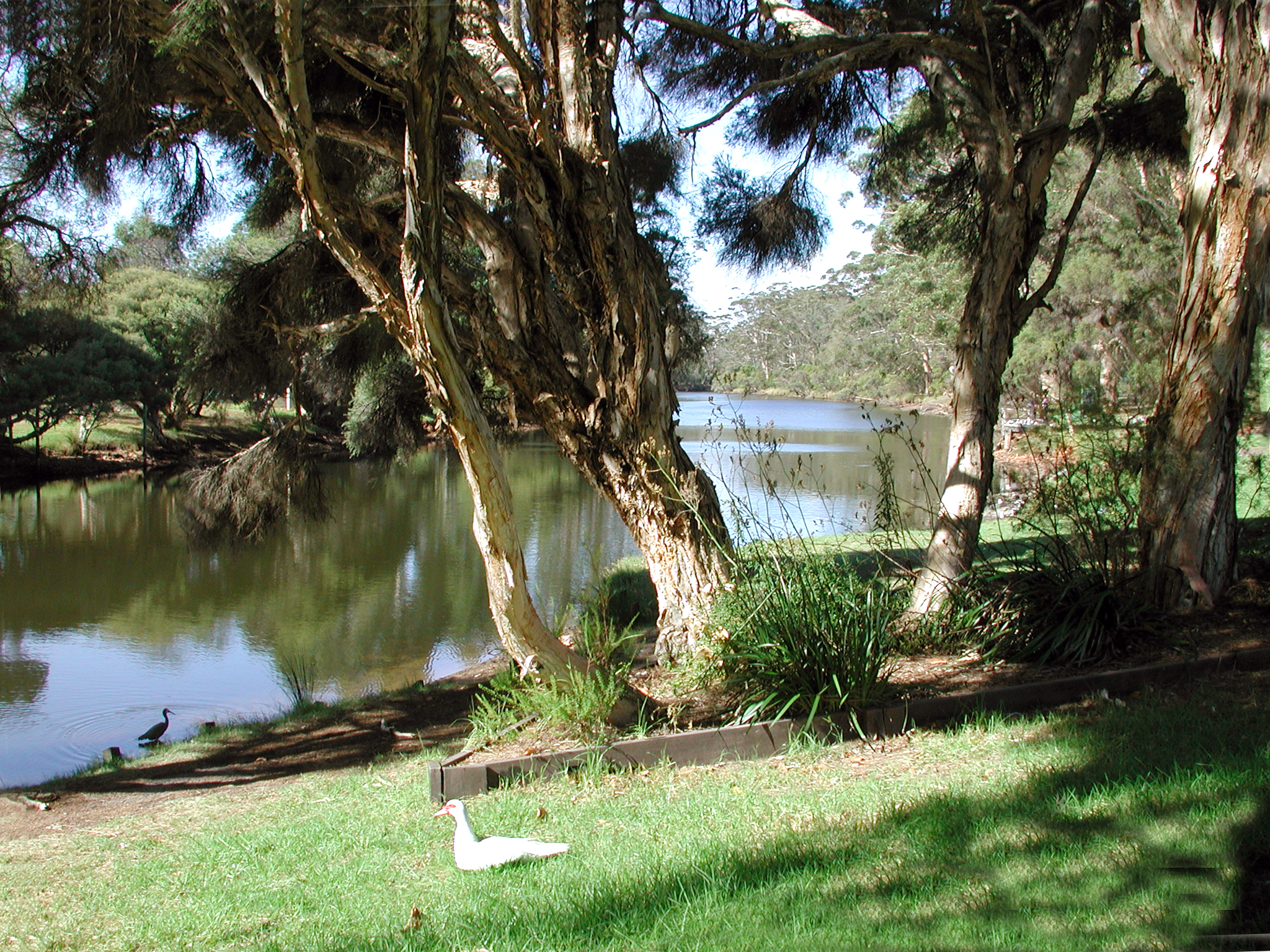
Denmark River and Berridge Park

Denmark is a rural town with timber milling, orcharding, beef cattle and dairy farming as its primary industries. Soil and climate attract wine growers, with tourism being the fastest growing business in Denmark. There is limited commercial fishing in Wilson Inlet. Denmark has no harbour.

The town is home to the Western Australian College of Agriculture – Denmark, a 560-hectare (1,400-acre) working farm and educational facility for Year 10, 11 and 12 students providing specialist education in farming and farm-related studies. It is also home to Denmark Senior High School.

Denmark was awarded the title of Australia's Tidiest Town in 1998.

On the Denmark River near Wilson Inlet there is a wooden Heritage Railway bridge where several walking trails come together including the Bibbulmun Track, which runs from the Perth region to Albany, and the "Denmark–Nornalup Heritage Trail".

Denmark is on the South Coast Highway, and is serviced by the Transwa public transport system. The town has an airstrip for small planes.

== Flora and fauna ==
Denmark is surrounded by native woodland with a large variety of trees, including the eucalypts marri, karri, jarrah and red tingle. The latter can reach a height of 60 metres (200 ft). A distinctive local tree is the red-flowering gum.

There are many indigenous bird species, including splendid fairy-wrens, emus, Australian white ibis, Australian magpies and Australian ringnecks. Many species of reptiles including snakes and skinks can be found. Marsupials such as the western grey kangaroo, the southern brown bandicoot and the common brushtail possum also live in the area.

The abundance of fish, squid and other marine life in the Denmark estuaries and along the coastline attracts bottlenose dolphins and seals; seasonally southern right whales rest there during their long migrations to the north.

Greens Pool (located between Denmark and Walpole) is a sandy white beach ringed by large granite boulders. It is part of William Bay National Park and a main tourist attraction in summer.

Denmark is a well-known recreational fishing location with a variety of catch including snapper, salmon, bream, King George whiting and abalone.

== Notable people ==
- Emma Booth – actress, was brought up in Denmark.
- Joel Hamling – Sydney Swans footballer, was born in Denmark.
- Luc Longley – former centre in the American National Basketball Association, and his wife, musician and celebrity chef Anna Gare, are Denmark residents.

== See also ==
- Ocean Beach
- Great Southern (wine region)
- South Coast Highway
