= Walpole, Western Australia =

Walpole
- Town
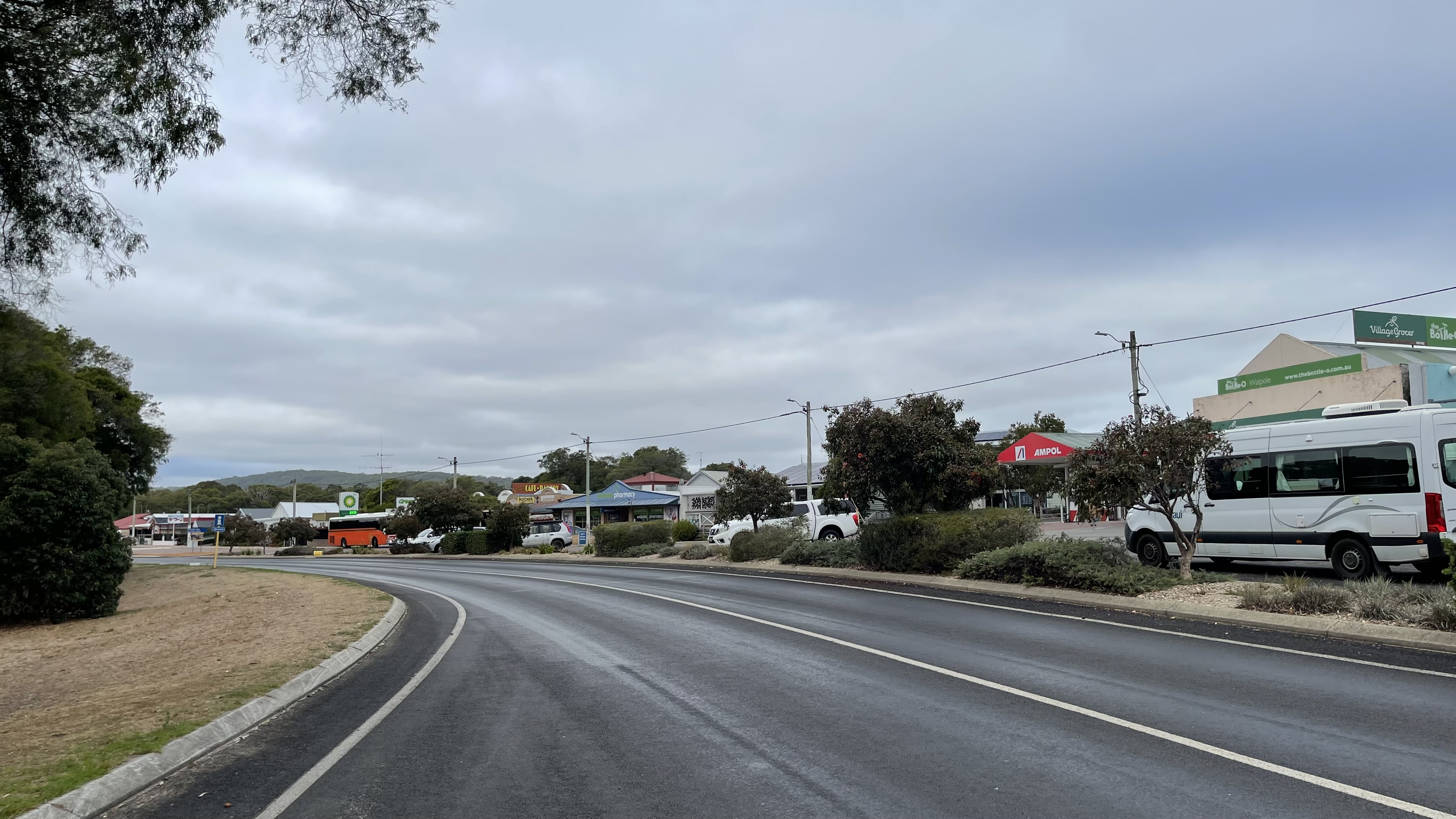
- Looking east through Walpole along South Western Highway

- Interactive map of Walpole
- Coordinates: 34.977705°S 116.733728°E
- Country: Australia
- State: Western Australia
- LGA: Shire of Manjimup
- Location: 423 km (263 mi) SSE of Perth; 66 km (41 mi) W of Denmark; 120 km (75 mi) S of Manjimup
- Established: 1933

Government
  - State electorate: Warren-Blackwood
  - Federal division: O'Connor

Area
  - Total: 56.3 km^{2} (21.7 sq mi)

Population
  - Total: 336 (UCL 2021)
- Postcode: 6398
Localities around Walpole
North Walpole	North Walpole	Hazelvale
Broke	Walpole	Nornalup
Broke	Nornalup	Nornalup

Walpole is a town in the south-western region of Western Australia, located approximately 430 km (270 mi) south southeast of Perth, and 66 km (41 mi) west of Denmark.

== Location and description ==
Walpole lies very close to the northern point of the 100 ha (250-acre) Walpole Inlet, from which it takes its name.

The inlet in turn is named for the Walpole River, discovered in 1831 by Captain Thomas Bannister, and named by Governor Stirling for Captain W. Walpole, with whom he had served aboard HMS Warspite in 1808.

The first European settlers to arrive in the area were Pierre Bellanger and his family in 1909. They travelled aboard Grace Darling from Albany to take up 1,600 hectares (4,000 acres) of land.

Land in the Walpole area was reserved for a national park in 1910, and the area subsequently became a popular holiday destination. Major development began to occur in the 1930s as part of the land settlement scheme. The railway reached Nornalup in 1929, and the Walpole town site was gazetted in 1933. The local electricity grid is remote and fragile, and a 1.5 MW / 30 MWh (15 hours) pumped-storage hydroelectricity facility is being built to stabilize power for Walpole.

== Name ==
Walpole was always the preferred name, but it was believed this was already in use in Tasmania. So the newly gazetted township was officially named Nornalup, but this caused confusion with the railway terminus 13 km (8 mi) east. Eventually the post office advised that there was no Walpole in Tasmania, and in 1934 the town reverted to its original name of Walpole.

Walpole is one of the few towns through which the Bibbulmun Track passes.

The area is famous for the giant tingle and karri trees of old growth forest. Another attraction is the Valley of the Giants Tree Top Walk in the Walpole-Nornalup National Park.

== See also ==
- List of towns in Western Australia
