= List of State Register of Heritage Places in the Shire of Plantagenet =

List of heritage sites in Western Australia

The State Register of Heritage Places is maintained by the Heritage Council of Western Australia. As of 2026, 74 places are heritage-listed in the Shire of Plantagenet, of which six are on the State Register of Heritage Places.

== List ==
=== State Register of Heritage Places ===
The Western Australian State Register of Heritage Places, as of 2026, lists the following six state registered places within the Shire of Plantagenet:

Place name	Place #	Street number	Street name	Suburb or town	Co-ordinates	Notes & former names	Photo
Hassell Homestead	2262		Corner Albany Highway & Jellicoe Road	Kendenup	34.506602°S 117.597235°E	Kalgan Hall, Kendenup / Keninup Homestead	
Police Station and Gaol Complex (former)	2268		Albany Highway	Mount Barker	34.618117°S 117.660167°E		
St Werburgh's Chapel and Cemetery	2284		Chapel Road	Mount Barker	34.6852°S 117.599827°E	St Werbergh's Chapel	
Mount Barker Railway Station (former)	2318		Lowood Road	Mount Barker	34.627924°S 117.663806°E		
St Werburgh's Farm Buildings	10996		St Werburghs Road	Mount Barker	34.687668°S 117.595466°E		
Round House, Mount Barker	16781	31712	Albany Highway	Mount Barker	34.615148°S 117.659785°E		

=== Shire of Plantagenet heritage-listed places ===
The following places are heritage listed in the Shire of Plantagenet but are not State registered:

Place name	Place #	Street number	Street name	Suburb or town	Notes & former names	Photo
Narrikup Hall	2259			Narrikup, 15 km South of Mount Barker		
Forest Hill Agricultural Hall	2260			Forest Hill		
Kendenup Hall	2261	Corner	Beverley Street & Hassell Avenue	Kendenup		
Shepherd's Store	2263		Hassell Avenue	Kendenup		
Mining Battery (former)	2264		Jellicoe Road	Kendenup	Five Stamp Battery	
Primary School	2265		Austin Street	Kendenup	Kendenup School	
District Hall	2266			Porongurup		
Mount Barker Police Station - Second	2267		Albany Highway	Mount Barker	Student Hostel	
Old Coach Inn (ruins)	2269		MacDonald Street	Mount Barker	Park Hotel (former), Old Bush Inn Hotel	
Mount Barker Post Office (former)	2270	Corner	Albany Highway & Ormond Road	Mount Barker	Old Post Office/Arts Centre	
Mount Barker Primary School (former)	2271	30	Albany Highway	Mount Barker	Seventh Day Adventist Church	
Plantagenet District Hospital	2272	47	Langton Road	Mount Barker		
Plantagenet District Hospital Nurses Quarters	2273		Langton Road	Mount Barker		
Mount Barker Hotel (former)	2274	Corner	Langton & Lowood Roads	Mount Barker	The Top Pub	
ANZ Bank (former)	2275	17	Lowood Road	Mount Barker	Mt Barker Coffee Lounge	
Park Hotel (former)	2276	Corner	Lowood Road & Muir Street	Mount Barker	Plantagenet Hotel, Bottom Pub	
Bank of New South Wales & Quarters (NSW) (former)	2277	Corner	Lowood Road & Short Street	Mount Barker	Westpac Bank	
Mount Barker Court House and Police Station	2279		Mt Barker Street	Mount Barker		
Police Quarters	2280		Mt Barker Street	Mount Barker		
Plantagenet District Hall	2281	Corner	Albany Highway & Muir Street	Mount Barker		
All Saints Anglican Church	2282	Corner	Albany Highway & Nunarrup Street	Mount Barker		
Nonconformist Church (former)	2283	Corner	Albany Highway & Ormond Road	Mount Barker	Uniting Church Meeting Place	
Abbeyholme	3295	40	Mitchell Streetreet	Mount Barker	James Sounness's House	
Railway House	3383	11	Albany Highway	Mount Barker	Westrail House, Old Mount Barker Station House	
Old Hay River Bridge	3517		St Werburghs Road	Mount Barker		
Bakehouse (former), Kendenup	4000	55	Hassell Avenue	Kendenup		
Mt Barker War Memorial & RSL Memorial Park	5544		Muir Street	Mount Barker		
Avoca	10978		Albany Highway	Mount Barker		
Bolganup	10979		Porongurup Road	Porongurup		
Jones Cottage	10980		Lowood Road	Mount Barker		
Duckett's Building	10981		Langton Road	Mount Barker		
First Hospital (Nursing Home)	10982	60	Langton Road	Mount Barker	Hospital/Doctor's Surgery, Private Residence	
Government Dam	10983	Corner	Lowood Road & McDonald Avenue	Mount Barker		
Hay River Farm Cairn	10984		Spencer Road	Narrikup		
Hicks Well	10985		Albany Highway	Mount Barker		
Karribank Lodge	10986			Porongurup		
Langton	10987		Muir Highway	Mount Barker	Goundrey Wines	
Masonic Hall	10988		Muir Street	Mount Barker		
Maud Scott's Greengrocers (former)	10989		Lowood Road	Mount Barker	Sue's Hardressing Salon, Mary Weiss'	
Merryup	10990		Muir Highway	Mount Barker		
Narrikup Store	10991		Spencer Road	Narrikup		
Ongerup	10992			Mount Barker	Ungerup	
A M Pearse & Co Garage	10993		Lowood Road	Mount Barker	Garrity's Garage	
Plantagenet Second Hospital	10994	21	Menston Street	Mount Barker	Plantagenet Hospital	
Frost Park	10995		MacDonald Avenue	Mount Barker	Showgrounds	
The Rookery	10997		Albany Highway	Mount Barker		
Reeves Tearoom & Fuel Depot	10998		Lowood Road	Mount Barker	Warrie's	
Peerimbup (former)	10999		Albany Highway	Mount Barker	Williams Rest, Chateau Barker Winery	
Woogenellup Bridge	11001		North Woogenilup Road	Woogenellup		
St Werburgh's Homestead	11074	66	Goundrey Road	Mount Barker	Egerton-Warburton Homestead	
New Kalgan River Road Bridge	11721		South Coast Highway	Kalgan	Upper Kalgan River bridge	
Upper Kalgan River Road Bridge	13073		North Woogenilup Road	Woogenellup	Road Bridge, Kalgan River, MRWA 4324	
Mount Barker Fire Station	14608		Lowood Road	Mount Barker		
Church	15204		Albany Highway	Mount Barker		
Manse	15205		Ormond Road	Mount Barker		
Waddy's Hut	15467		Wansbrough Walk	Porongurup National Park		
Old Kalgan River Road Bridge	16090		old alignment of South Coast Highway	Kalgan	Upper Kalgan Bridge	
Kalgan River Road Bridge	16106		Chesterpass Road	South Stirling Range National Park	Upper Kalgan Road Bridge	
Rocky Gully Primary School	16242	Lot 108	Arbour Street	Rocky Gully		
Mount Barker Primary School	16302		Oatlands Road	Mount Barker		
Forest Hill and Moriarty-Camballup Trails	16799					
Mount Barker Fruit Inspection & Dehydration Shed (former)	17587		Lowood Road	Mount Barker	Mount Barker Fruit Growers' Cool Storage Co-o, Fruit Packing Shed, Railway Goods Shed	
Porongurup National Park	18716		Mt Barker Porongurup Road	Woodlands via Mount Barker		
Pre-school, 8 Ormond St, Mt Barker	24706	8	Ormond Street	Mount Barker	Cooinda Aboriginal Pre-school	
Manurup Block (Mt Barker Research Station)	25140		Eulap-Manurup Road	Mount Barker		
Mount Barker Research Station	25142	7107	Eulup-Manurup Road	Mount Barker		
Hay River Road Bridge, Pardelup	25525			Plantagenet	MRWA Bridge 502	
Bridge 500, Muir Highway over Kent River, Perillup	26304		Muir Highway	Perillup		
