= Leucopogon decrescens =

Scientific classification
- Kingdom: Plantae
- Clade: Tracheophytes
- Clade: Angiosperms
- Clade: Eudicots
- Clade: Asterids
- Order: Ericales
- Family: Ericaceae
- Genus: Leucopogon
- Species: L. decrescens

Binomial name
- Leucopogon decrescens Hislop
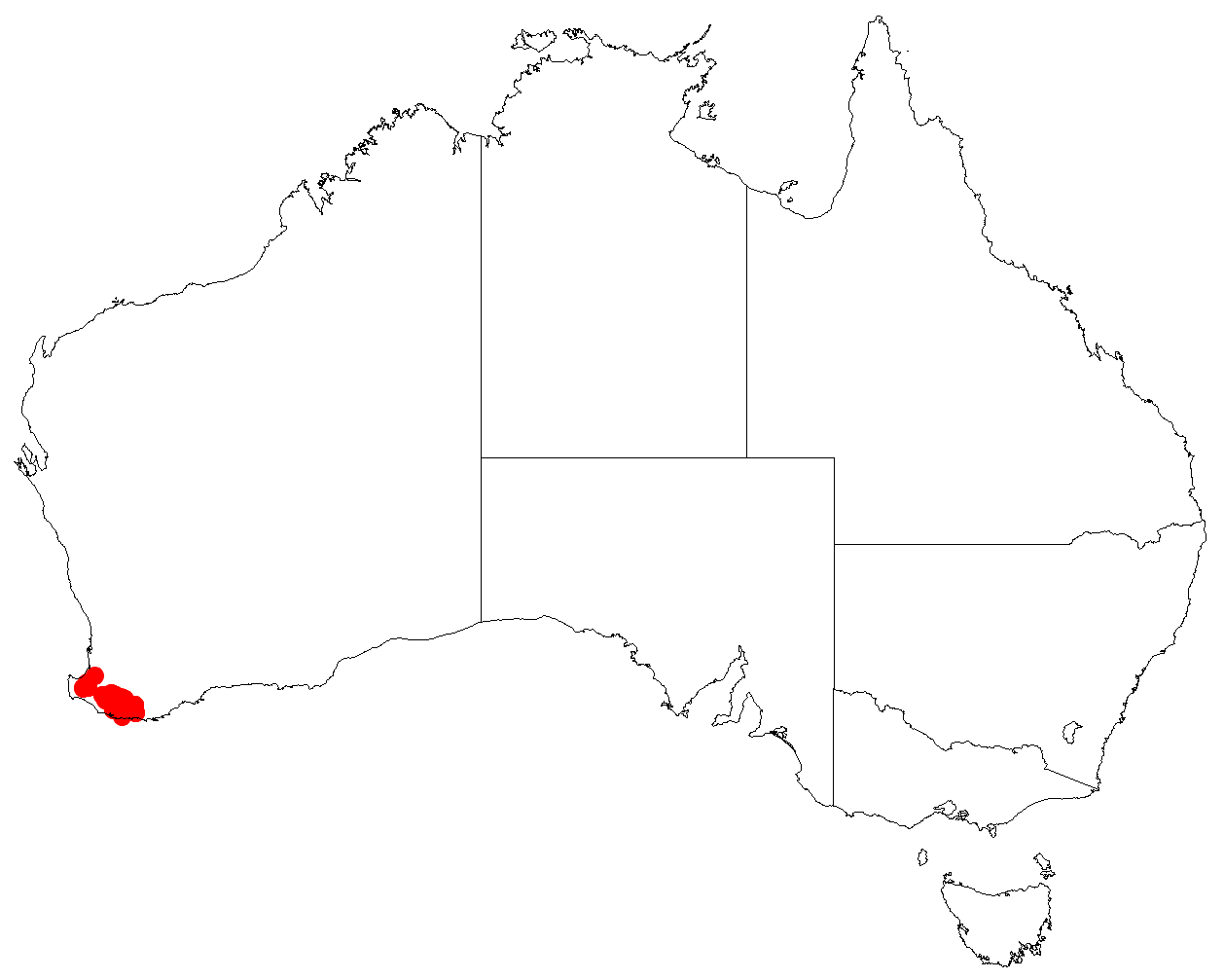
- Occurrence data from AVH

Species of plant

Leucopogon decrescens is a species of flowering plant in the heath family Ericaceae and is endemic to the far south-west of Western Australia. It is an erect shrub with hairy young branchlets, spirally arranged, narrowly egg-shaped leaves, and white, bell-shaped flowers often with a pink tinge.

== Description ==
Leucopogon decrescens is an erect, open shrub that typically grows up to about 70 cm (28 in) high and wide with a single stem at the base. The leaves are spirally arranged and point upwards, narrowly egg-shaped, 2.0–7.2 mm (0.079–0.283 in) long and 0.9–1.6 mm (0.035–0.063 in) wide on a very short petiole. The flowers are arranged in groups of 4 to 11, 4–10 mm (0.16–0.39 in) long on the ends of branches and in upper leaf axils, with narrow egg-shaped bracts and similar bracteoles 1.5–2.5 mm (0.059–0.098 in) long. The sepals are egg-shaped, 2.3–3.0 mm (0.091–0.118 in) long and tinged with purple, the petals white and joined at the base to form a bell-shaped tube 1.2–1.7 mm (0.047–0.067 in) long, the lobes 2.0–3.2 mm (0.079–0.126 in) long and often tinged with pink. Flowering occurs in August and September and the fruit is a cylindrical drupe 1.8–2.8 mm (0.071–0.110 in) long.

== Taxonomy and naming ==
Leucopogon decrescens was first formally described in 2014 by Michael Clyde Hislop in the journal Nuytsia from specimens he collected near Rocky Gully in 2008. The specific epithet (decrescens) means "diminishing" or "narrowing", referring to the outline of the leaves from their widest point to the tip.

== Distribution and habitat ==
This leucopogon grows in woodland or heath and occurs in a narrow band from the Whicher Range to Rocky Gully and Mount Barker in the Jarrah Forest and Warren bioregions in the far south-west of Western Australia.

== Conservation status ==
Leucopogon decrescens is classified as "not threatened" by the Western Australian Government Department of Biodiversity, Conservation and Attractions
