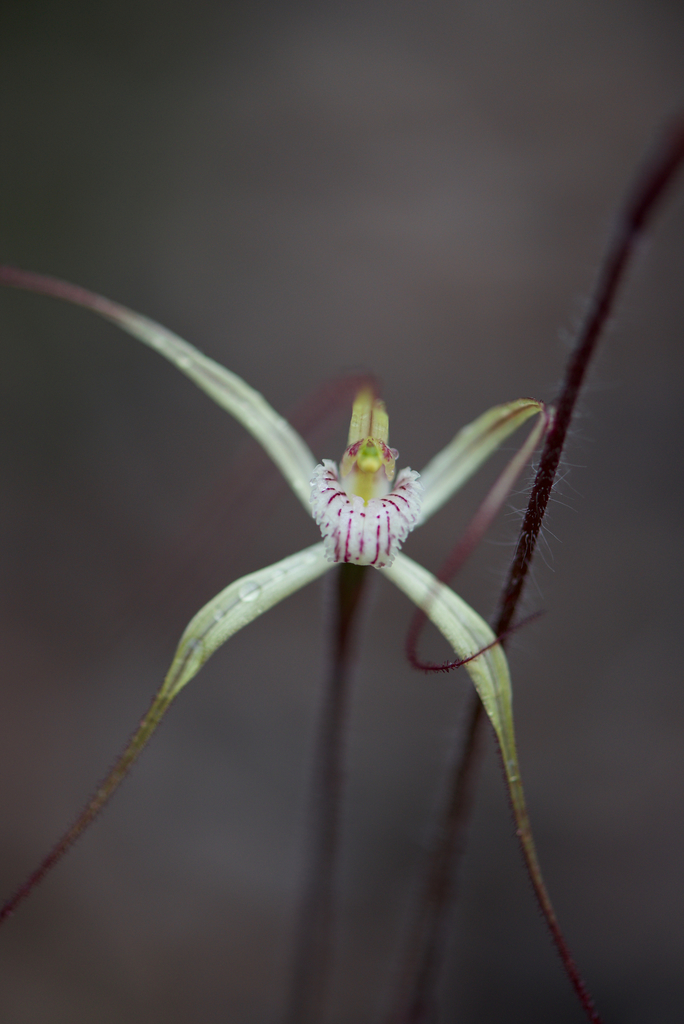

Conservation status
- Priority One — Poorly Known Taxa (DEC)

Scientific classification
- Kingdom: Plantae
- Clade: Embryophytes
- Clade: Tracheophytes
- Clade: Spermatophytes
- Clade: Angiosperms
- Clade: Monocots
- Order: Asparagales
- Family: Orchidaceae
- Subfamily: Orchidoideae
- Tribe: Diurideae
- Genus: Caladenia
- Species: C. validinervia

Binomial name
- Caladenia validinervia A.P.Br. & G.Brockman ex A.P.Br. & G.Brockman

Synonyms
- Caladenia sp. 'Muir Highway'

= Caladenia validinervia =

Lake Muir spider orchid

Species of orchid

Caladenia validinervia, commonly known as the Lake Muir spider orchid, is a species of orchid endemic to the south-west of Western Australia. It has a single erect, hairy leaf and up to three greenish to creamy white flowers with red stripes on the sepals and petals. The flowers have relatively narrow sepals and petals and a relatively small labellum. It is a rare orchid only known from an area between Rocky Gully and Collie.

== Description ==
Caladenia validinervia is a terrestrial, perennial, deciduous, herb with an underground tuber and which grows as solitary plants. It has a single erect leaf, 50–160 mm long, 3–6 mm wide and pale green with reddish-purple blotches near its base. Up to three greenish to creamy white flowers 50–80 mm across are borne on a stalk 120–210 mm high. The sepals and petals suddenly narrow about one-third along to a brownish-black, thread-like, densely glandular tip. The dorsal sepal is erect near its base then curves forward and is 40–70 mm long and about 2 mm wide. The lateral sepals and petals have the same dimensions as the dorsal sepal but spread apart from each other, horizontally near their base but then curve downwards, drooping near the tips. The labellum is 7–10 mm long, 5–8 mm wide and creamy-white to pale yellow with red lines and spots and short, blunt teeth on its sides. There are two rows of cream-coloured, narrow anvil-shaped calli up to 1.5 mm long, along the centre of the labellum. Flowering occurs from September to October.

== Taxonomy and naming ==
Caladenia validinervia was first described in 2015 by Andrew Brown and Garry Brockman after an unpublished description by Stephen Hopper and Andrew Brown. The type specimen was collected near Muir Highway and the description was published in Nuytsia. The specific epithet (validinervia) is derived from the Latin words validus meaning "strong", "sound" or "powerful" and nervus meaning "sinew" or "tendon", referring to the prominent red stripes on the flower parts.

== Distribution and habitat ==
The Lake Muir spider orchid is only known from a small area between Rocky Gully on Muir Highway and Collie in the Jarrah Forest biogeographic region where it grows in jarrah and marri woodland.

== Conservation ==
Caladenia validinervia is classified as "Priority One" by the Government of Western Australia Department of Parks and Wildlife, meaning that it is known from only one or a few locations which are potentially at risk.
