= Mordalup, Western Australia =

Locality in the Shire of Manjimup, Western Australia

Mordalup
- other
- Coordinates: 34.32023°S 116.60616°E
- Country: Australia
- State: Western Australia
- LGA: Shire of Manjimup
- Location: 272 km (169 mi) from Perth; 45 km (28 mi) from Manjimup

Government
  - State electorate: Warren-Blackwood
  - Federal division: O'Connor

Area
  - Total: 320.4 km^{2} (123.7 sq mi)

Population
  - Total: 14 (SAL 2021)
- Postcode: 6258
Localities around Mordalup
Tonebridge	Tonebridge	Tonebridge
Perup	Mordalup	Frankland River
Lake Muir	Lake Muir	Lake Muir

Mordalup is a rural locality of the Shire of Manjimup in the South West region of Western Australia. The locality's southern border is formed by the Muir Highway. The Tone River flows through Mordalup from north to south before turning west in the far south of the locality. Mordalup also borders the northern shore of Lake Muir.

Mordalup is located on the traditional land of the Bibulman people of the Noongar nation.

In October 1910, a state school was opened in Mordalup, consisting of a small slab hut.
