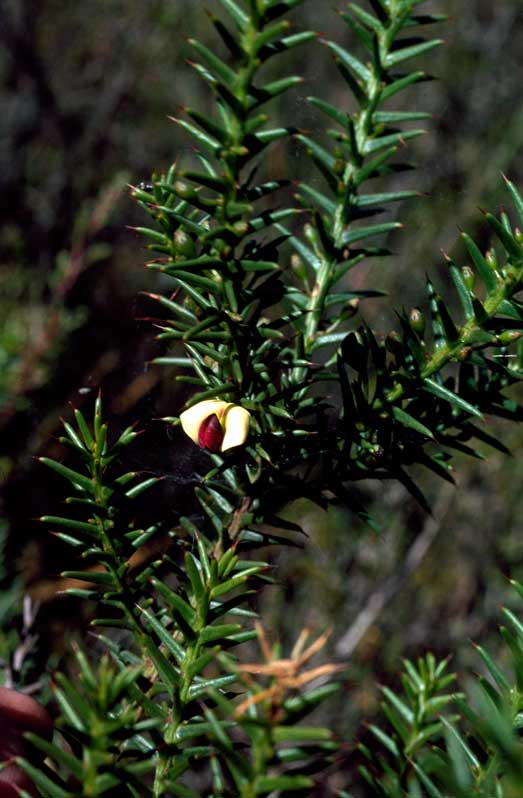
- Near Albany

Scientific classification
- Kingdom: Plantae
- Clade: Tracheophytes
- Clade: Angiosperms
- Clade: Eudicots
- Clade: Rosids
- Order: Fabales
- Family: Fabaceae
- Subfamily: Faboideae
- Genus: Daviesia
- Species: D. spinosissima

Binomial name
- Daviesia spinosissima Meisn.

= Daviesia spinosissima =

Species of legume

Daviesia spinosissima is a species of flowering plant in the family Fabaceae and is endemic to the south of Western Australia. It is a shrub with crowded, rigid, sharply-pointed, narrowly triangular phyllodes, and yellow and red flowers.

== Description ==
Daviesia spinosissima is a rigid, glabrous shrub that typically grows to a height of 0.6–2 m (2 ft 0 in – 6 ft 7 in). Its phyllodes are crowded, rigid, vertically compressed and narrowly triangular, 7–15 mm (0.28–0.59 in) long, 1.5–3 mm (0.059–0.118 in) wide and sharply pointed. The flowers are arranged singly in leaf axils on a pedicel 3–6 mm (0.12–0.24 in) long with bracts about 1 mm (0.039 in) long attached. The sepals are 6–7 mm (0.24–0.28 in) long and joined at the base with lobes about 1.5 mm (0.059 in) long. The standard petal is broadly egg-shaped with a notched tip, 9.5–11 mm (0.37–0.43 in) long, 11–12 mm (0.43–0.47 in) wide and yellow. The wings are 9.5–10 mm (0.37–0.39 in) long and red, the keel 8.5–9.0 mm (0.33–0.35 in) long and red. Flowering occurs from October to March and the fruit is a triangular, sharply-pointed, inflated pod 10–13 mm (0.39–0.51 in) long.

== Taxonomy ==
Daviesia spinosissima was first formally described in 1844 by Carl Meissner in Lehmann's Plantae Preissianae. The specific epithet (spinosissima) means "very spiny".

== Distribution and habitat ==
This daviesia grows in heath in near-coastal areas of southern Western Australia between Narrikup, Denmark and near Mount Manypeaks in the Esperance Plains, Jarrah Forest and Warren biogeographic regions of south-western Western Australia.

== Conservation status ==
Daviesia spinosissima is listed as "not threatened" by the Government of Western Australia Department of Biodiversity, Conservation and Attractions.
