= Perillup, Western Australia =

Locality in the Shire of Plantagenet, Western Australia

Perillup
- other
- Coordinates: 34.59667°S 117.19500°E
- Country: Australia
- State: Western Australia
- LGA(s): Shire of Plantagenet
- Location: 312 km (194 mi) SE of Perth; 82 km (51 mi) NW of Albany; 41 km (25 mi) NW of Mount Barker

Government
  - State electorate(s): Warren-Blackwood
  - Federal division(s): O'Connor

Area
  - Total: 691.4 km^{2} (267.0 sq mi)

Population
  - Total(s): 46 (SAL 2016)
- Postcode: 6324
Localities around Perillup
Frankland River	Tenterden	Kendenup
Rocky Gully	Perillup	Forest Hill
Mount Romance	Mount Lindesay	Denbarker

Perillup is a rural locality of the Shire of Plantagenet in the Great Southern region of Western Australia. The Muir Highway passes through the locality from west to east while the Kent River passes through its north before forming much of its western border. Most of the locality south of the highway is taken up by the Mount Roe National Park while, to the north of the highway, the Randell Road and the unnamed WA11343 Nature Reserves are located.

== History ==
Perillup is located on the traditional land of the Menang people of the Noongar nation.

Like neighbouring Rocky Gully, Perillup was part of the soldier settlement scheme after the Second World War.

The bridge on the Muir Highway over the Kent River, at the border of Perillup and Rocky Gully, is on the shire's heritage register.

== Nature reserves ==
The Randell Road Nature Reserve was gazetted on 11 January 1963 and has a size of 4.45 square kilometres (1.72 sq mi). The WA11343 Nature Reserve was gazetted on 3 April 1908 and has a size of 1.25 square kilometres (0.48 sq mi). Both are located within the Jarrah Forest bioregion.
