= Redmond West, Western Australia =

Locality in the City of Albany, Western Australia

Redmond West
- Interactive map of Redmond West
- Coordinates: 34.90478°S 117.55395°E
- Country: Australia
- State: Western Australia
- LGA: City of Albany
- Location: 363 km (226 mi) SE of Perth; 34 km (21 mi) NW of Albany; 18 km (11 mi) NE of Denmark

Government
  - State electorate: Albany
  - Federal division: O'Connor

Area
  - Total: 151 km^{2} (58 sq mi)

Population
  - Total: 58 (SAL 2021)
- Postcode: 6327
Localities around Redmond West
Mount Lindesay	Narrikup	Narrikup
Mount Lindesay	Redmond West	Redmond
Hay	Youngs Siding	Torbay

Redmond West is a rural locality of the City of Albany in the Great Southern region of Western Australia. The north-western corner of the locality is taken up by the south-eastern section of the Mount Lindesay National Park and the Blue Gum Creek Nature Reserve is also located within Redmond West. The Hay River passes through it and also forms its boundary in the south-west.

Redmond West is on the traditional land of the Minang people of the Noongar nation.

Redmond West borders the locality of Redmond, which was established as a siding on the Great Southern Railway in 1912 and gazetted as a townsite in 1916. It is thought that the town was named after the Irish Nationalist leader, John Edward Redmond.

== Nature reserve ==
The Blue Gum Creek Nature Reserve was gazetted on 4 November 1927, has a size of 0.85 square kilometres (0.33 mi^{2}), and is located within the Jarrah Forest bioregion.
