= Leucopogon subsejunctus =

Conservation status
- Priority Two — Poorly Known Taxa (DEC)

Scientific classification
- Kingdom: Plantae
- Clade: Tracheophytes
- Clade: Angiosperms
- Clade: Eudicots
- Clade: Asterids
- Order: Ericales
- Family: Ericaceae
- Genus: Leucopogon
- Species: L. subsejunctus

Binomial name
- Leucopogon subsejunctus Hislop
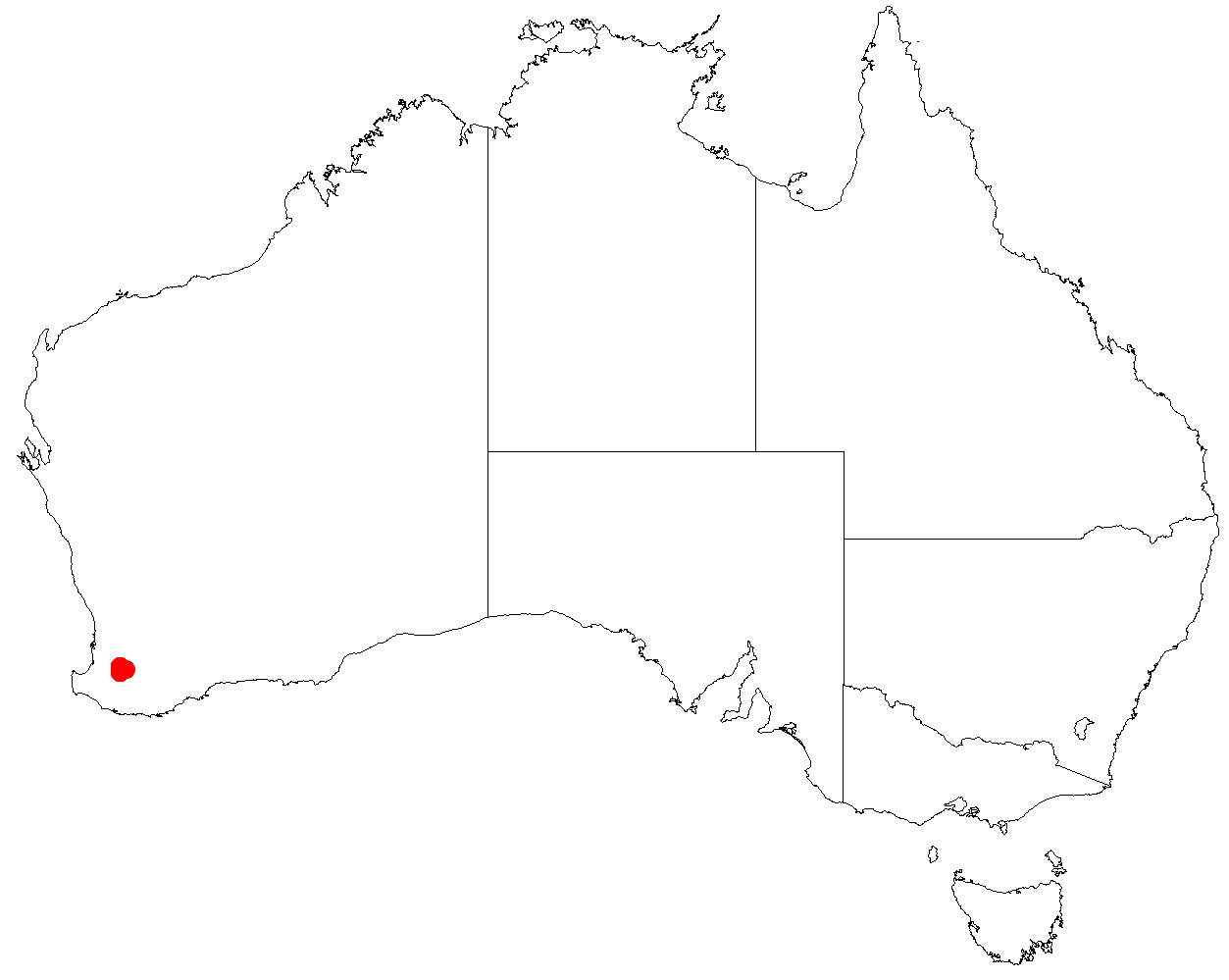
- Occurrence data from AVH

Species of plant

Leucopogon subsejunctus is a species of flowering plant in the heath family Ericaceae and is endemic to a restricted area in the south-west of Western Australia. It is an erect shrub with hairy young branchlets, spirally arranged, narrowly egg-shaped or narrowly elliptic leaves, and white, bell-shaped flowers with a pink tinge.

== Description ==
Leucopogon subsejunctus is an erect, open shrub that typically grows up to about 80 cm (31 in) high and wide with a single stem at the base. Its young branchlets are covered with straight, spreading hairs. The leaves are spirally arranged and point upwards, narrowly egg-shaped or narrowly elliptic, 3.0–8.5 mm (0.12–0.33 in) long and 1.0–2.5 mm (0.039–0.098 in) wide on a petiole 0.2–0.6 mm (0.0079–0.0236 in) long. The flowers are arranged in groups of three to eleven, 3–12 mm (0.12–0.47 in) long on the ends of branches and in upper leaf axils, with narrow egg-shaped to egg-shaped bracts and similar bracteoles 1.5–2.0 mm (0.059–0.079 in) long. The sepals are egg-shaped, 2.4–3.2 mm (0.094–0.126 in) long and tinged with purple near the tip, the petals white and joined at the base to form a bell-shaped or broadly bell-shaped tube 1.4–1.7 mm (0.055–0.067 in) long, the lobes 2.6–3.5 mm (0.10–0.14 in) long and tinged with pink. Flowering mostly occurs in August and September and the fruit is a deeply-lobed drupe 2.6–3.0 mm (0.10–0.12 in) long.

== Taxonomy and naming ==
Leucopogon subsejunctus was first formally described in 2014 by Michael Clyde Hislop in the journal Nuytsia from specimens he collected near Rocky Gully in 2008. The specific epithet (subsejunctus) means "somewhat separated", referring to "the remarkable morphology of the mature fruit which is so deeply lobed that the individual locules are almost completely separated from each other".

== Distribution and habitat ==
This leucopogon grows in woodland near Darkan in the Jarrah Forest bioregion in the south-west of Western Australia.

== Conservation status ==
Leucopogon subsejunctus is listed as "Priority Two" by the Western Australian Government Department of Biodiversity, Conservation and Attractions, meaning that it is poorly known and from only one or a few locations.
