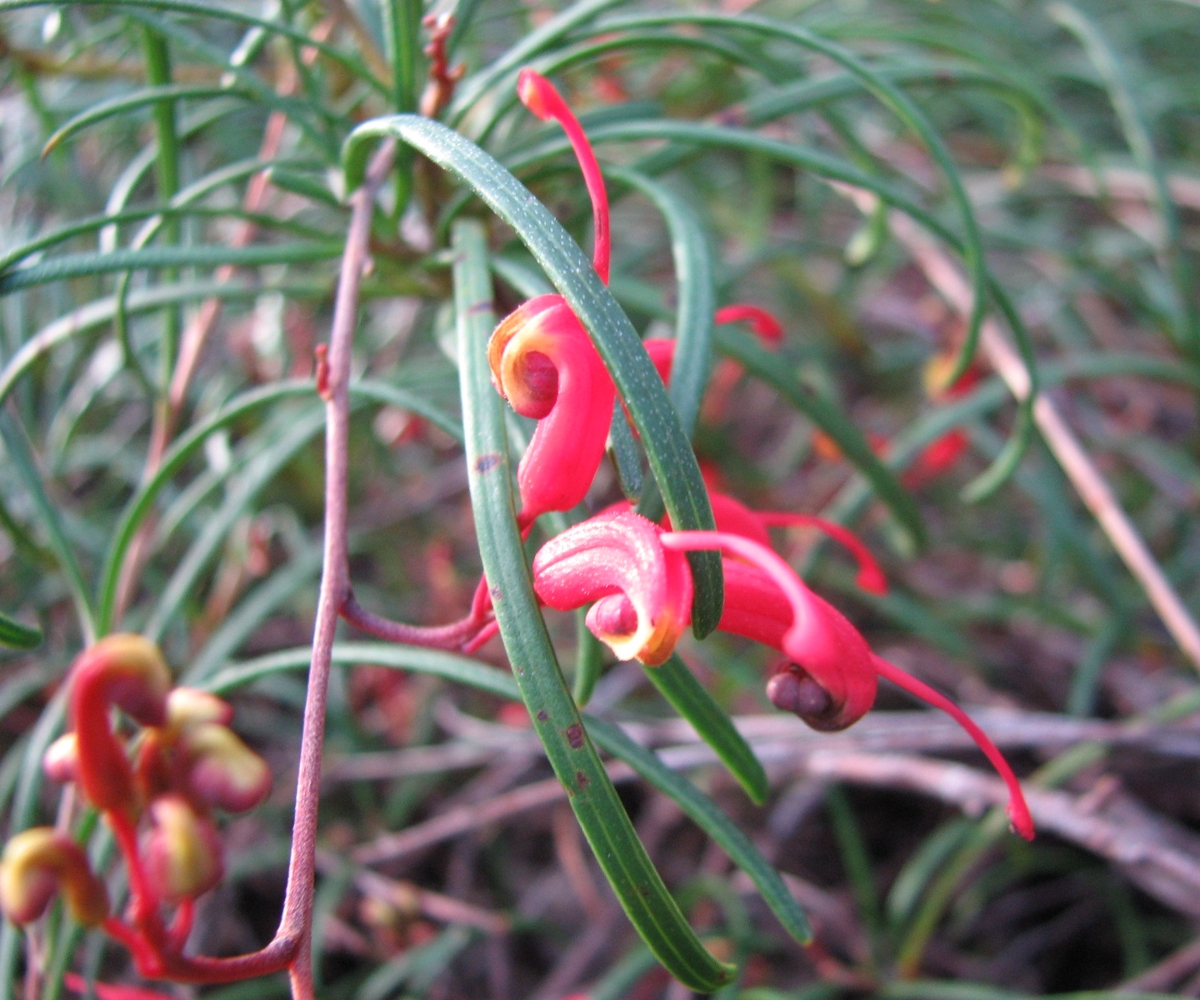

Scientific classification
- Kingdom: Plantae
- Clade: Tracheophytes
- Clade: Angiosperms
- Clade: Eudicots
- Order: Proteales
- Family: Proteaceae
- Genus: Grevillea
- Species: G. nudiflora

Binomial name
- Grevillea nudiflora Meisn.

= Grevillea nudiflora =

Species of shrub endemic to Western Australia

Grevillea nudiflora is a species of flowering plant in the family Proteaceae and is endemic to the south coast of Western Australia. It is a prostrate to low, spreading shrub, usually with linear leaves, and with small groups of red and yellow flowers often close to the ground on long flowering stems.

== Description ==
Grevillea nudiflora is a prostrate to spreading shrub that typically grows up to 0.3 m (1 ft 0 in) high and 2 m (6 ft 7 in) wide, or sometimes up to 2 m (6 ft 7 in) high. Its leaves are usually linear, 40–250 mm (1.6–9.8 in) long and 1–5 mm (0.039–0.197 in) wide with the edges turned down, concealing most of the lower surface. The flowers are arranged in groups of two to six on long trailing peduncles up to 2.5 m (8 ft 2 in) long, occasionally on shorter peduncles within the foliage, on a rachis 3–5 mm (0.12–0.20 in) long. The flowers are red or deep pink with yellow or grey blotches, the pistil 19–24 mm (0.75–0.94 in) long. Flowering occurs from July to November, sometimes in other months, and the fruit is an erect follicle 10–18 mm (0.39–0.71 in) long.

== Taxonomy ==
Grevillea nudiflora was first formally described in 1856 by Carl Meissner in de Candolle's Prodromus Systematis Naturalis Regni Vegetabilis from specimens collected by James Drummond in the Swan River Colony. The specific epithet (nudiflora) means "bare-flowered".

== Distribution and habitat ==
This grevillea grows in woodland, forest and heath from near Albany to Cape Arid National Park and inland as far as Mount Barker and Ravensthorpe in the Esperance Plains, Jarrah Forest and Mallee bioregions of southern Western Australia.

== Conservation status ==
Grevillea nudiflora is listed as "not threatened" by the Western Australian Government Department of Parks and Wildlife

== See also ==
- List of Grevillea species
