= Synaphea favosa =

Scientific classification
- Kingdom: Plantae
- Clade: Tracheophytes
- Clade: Angiosperms
- Clade: Eudicots
- Order: Proteales
- Family: Proteaceae
- Genus: Synaphea
- Species: S. favosa

Binomial name
- Synaphea favosa R.Br.

Synonyms
- Synaphea favosa R.Br. var. favosa; Synaphea favosa var. lanceolata Meisn.

Species of Australian shrub in the family Proteaceae

Synaphea favosa is a species of flowering plant in the family Proteaceae and is endemic to the south-west of Western Australia. It is a low, spreading shrub with mostly lance-shaped to egg-shaped leaves with the lower end towards the base, spikes of rather openly spaced yellow flowers and egg-shaped fruit.

== Description ==
Synaphea favosa is a low, spreading shrub with sometimes erect stems up to 80 mm (3.1 in) long and covered with soft hairs. The leaves are lance-shaped to egg-shaped with the narrower end towards the base, sometimes with teeth or lobes, 50–120 mm (2.0–4.7 in) long and 15–30 mm (0.59–1.18 in) wide on a petiole 20–100 mm (0.79–3.94 in) long, and with three main veins. The flowers are yellow and borne in rather openly-branched spikes 50–80 mm (2.0–3.1 in) long on a sometimes branched peduncle up to 70 mm (2.8 in) long. The perianth is widely open, the upper tepal 6.0–6.5 mm (0.24–0.26 in) long and 2.0–2.6 mm (0.079–0.102 in) wide, the lower tepal 3.5–4.5 mm (0.14–0.18 in) long. The stigma is elliptic with two erect horns, 1.2–1.5 mm (0.047–0.059 in) long and 1.2–1.3 mm (0.047–0.051 in) wide. Flowering occurs from September to November and the fruit is egg-shaped, 3.5–4.0 mm (0.14–0.16 in) long and covered with soft hairs.

== Taxonomy ==
Synaphea favosa was first formally described in 1810 by Robert Brown (botanist, born 1773) in Transactions of the Linnean Society of London. The specific epithet (favosa) means 'abounding in honeycomb', referring to the leaf veins.

== Distribution and habitat ==
This species of Synaphea grows in sand over gravel or sandstone in kwongan from Rocky Gully to Denmark and east to Bremer Bay including the Stirling Range in the Avon Wheatbelt, Esperance Plains, Jarrah Forest, Mallee and Warren bioregion of south-western Western Australia.

== Conservation status ==
Synaphea favosa is listed as "not threatened" by the Government of Western Australia Department of Biodiversity, Conservation and Attractions.
