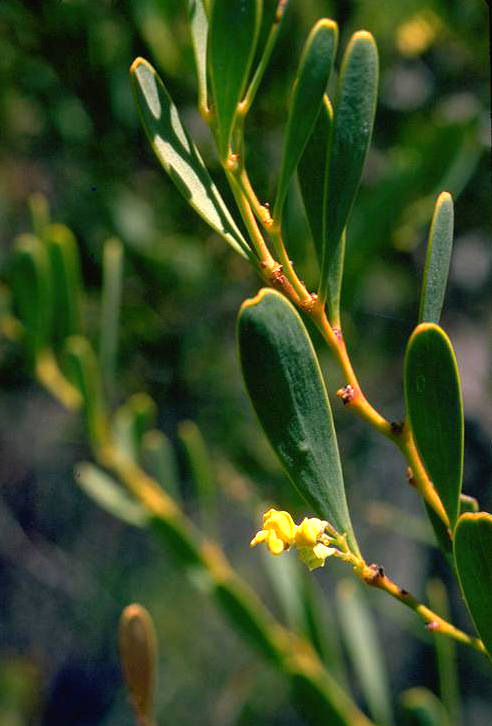
- Near Ravensthorpe

Scientific classification
- Kingdom: Plantae
- Clade: Embryophytes
- Clade: Tracheophytes
- Clade: Spermatophytes
- Clade: Angiosperms
- Clade: Eudicots
- Clade: Rosids
- Order: Fabales
- Family: Fabaceae
- Subfamily: Faboideae
- Genus: Daviesia
- Species: D. emarginata

Binomial name
- Daviesia emarginata (Miq.) Crisp

= Daviesia emarginata =

Species of flowering plant

Daviesia emarginata is a species of flowering plant in the family Fabaceae and is endemic to the south-west of Western Australia. It is an erect, mostly glabrous shrub with scattered egg-shaped phyllodes with the narrower end towards the base and with a notch at the tip, and yellow and pink flowers.

== Description ==
Daviesia emarginata is an erect, mostly glabrous shrub that typically grows to a height of 0.3–1.7 m (1 ft 0 in – 5 ft 7 in). Its leaves are reduced to scattered, egg-shaped phyllodes 24–50 mm (0.94–1.97 in) long and 3.5–9.5 mm (0.14–0.37 in) wide with a notch at the tip. The flowers are arranged in racemes of three to eight on a peduncle 1.5–6 mm (0.059–0.236 in) long, the rachis 3–12 mm (0.12–0.47 in) long, each flower on a pedicel 3.5–4.0 mm (0.14–0.16 in) long with oblong bracts about 1 mm (0.039 in) long at the base. The sepals are 4.5–5.0 mm (0.18–0.20 in) long and joined at the base, the two upper lobes joined for most of their length and the lower three triangular. The standard petal is egg-shaped with a central notch, about 4.5 mm (0.18 in) long, 5.0–5.5 mm (0.20–0.22 in) wide and yellow, the wings about 4.5 mm (0.18 in) long and yellow with a pink base, and the keel about 4.25 mm (0.167 in) long and yellow with a pink base. Flowering occurs from January to May and the fruit is a leathery, triangular pod 18–21 mm (0.71–0.83 in) long.

== Taxonomy and naming ==
This pea was first formally described in 1845 by Friedrich Anton Wilhelm Miquel who gave it the name Fusanus emarginatus in Johann Georg Christian Lehmann's Plantae Preissianae from specimens collected near Plantagenet in 1840. In 1995, Michael Crisp changed the name to Daviesia emarginata in the journal Phytotaxa. The specific epithet (emarginata) means "notched", referring to the phyllodes.

== Distribution and habitat ==
Daviesia emarginata grows on sandplains in mallee-heathland in near coastal areas between Albany, Ravensthorpe and inland to the Stirling Range in the Avon Wheatbelt, Esperance Plains, Jarrah Forest and Mallee biogeographic regions of south-western Western Australia.

== Conservation status ==
Daviesia emarginata is classified as "not threatened" by the Western Australian Government Department of Biodiversity, Conservation and Attractions.
