= Plantagenet Wines =

Winery in Western Australia

- Location: Lot 45 Albany Highway, Mount Barker WA 6324, Western Australia, Australia
- Coordinates: 34°37′22″S 117°39′44″E
- Wine region: Great Southern
- Other labels: Three Lions, Omrah Crossings
- Founded: 1968
- First vines planted: 1968
- First vintage: 1974
- Key people: Mike Garland, winemaker
- Parent company: Lionel Samson & Son
- Known for: Plantagenet Shiraz
- Varietals: Cabernet Sauvignon, Chardonnay, Merlot, Pinot noir, Riesling, Sangiovese, Sauvignon blanc, Semillon, Shiraz, Tempranillo
- Other attractions: Halliday 5 Star Winery; The Shed Cafe
- Distribution: International
- Tasting: Open to public
- Website: Plantagenet Wines

Plantagenet Wines is an Australian winery based at Mount Barker, in the Great Southern wine region of Western Australia. It includes Bouverie Vineyard in Denbarker, the first commercial vineyard to be planted in the region.

== See also ==
- Australian wine
- List of wineries in Western Australia
- Western Australian wine
