= Forest Hill, Western Australia =

Locality in the Shire of Plantagenet, Western Australia

Forest Hill
- Interactive map of Forest Hill
- Coordinates: 34.57917°S 117.46030°E
- Country: Australia
- State: Western Australia
- LGA: Shire of Plantagenet
- Location: 333 km (207 mi) SE of Perth; 58 km (36 mi) NW of Albany; 20 km (12 mi) W of Mount Barker

Government
  - State electorate: Warren-Blackwood
  - Federal division: O'Connor

Area
  - Total: 206.2 km^{2} (79.6 sq mi)

Population
  - Total: 143 (SAL 2021)
- Postcode: 6324
Localities around Forest Hill
Perillup	Kendenup	Kendenup
Perillup	Forest Hill	Mount Barker
Perillup	Denbarker	Mount Barker

Forest Hill is a rural locality of the Shire of Plantagenet in the Great Southern region of Western Australia. The Muir Highway passes through the locality from west to east, as does the Hay River. The Pardelup, Pardelup Road, Kwornicup Lake and Wamballup Nature Reserves are located within Forest Hill. Pardelup Prison Farm is also located within Forest Hill.

== History ==
Forest Hill is located on the traditional land of the Menang people of the Noongar nation.

The Forest Hill Agricultural Hall is listed on the shire's heritage register, having officially been opened in November 1911.

== Nature reserves ==
Four nature reserves are located within Forest Hill, all located within the Jarrah Forest bioregion:

- Kwornicup Lake Nature Reserve was gazetted on 19 October 1973 and has a size of 2.29 square kilometres (0.88 mi^{2}).
- Pardelup Nature Reserve was gazetted on 1 December 1950 and has a size of 6.07 square kilometres (2.34 mi^{2}).
- Pardelup Road Nature Reserve was gazetted on 24 September 1948 and has a size of 0.42 square kilometres (0.16 mi^{2}).
- Wamballup Nature Reserve was gazetted on 6 August 1909 and has a size of 4.74 square kilometres (1.83 mi^{2}).
