= Mount Lindesay, Western Australia =

Locality in the Shire of Denmark, Western Australia

Mount Lindesay
- other
- Coordinates: 34.80953°S 117.37469°E
- Country: Australia
- State: Western Australia
- LGA(s): Shire of Denmark
- Location: 348 km (216 mi) SE of Perth; 62 km (39 mi) NE of Walpole; 16 km (9.9 mi) N of Denmark

Government
  - State electorate(s): Warren-Blackwood
  - Federal division(s): O'Connor

Area
  - Total: 267 km^{2} (103 sq mi)

Population
  - Total(s): 0 (SAL 2016)
- Postcode: 6333
Localities around Mount Lindesay
Perillup	Denbarker	Denbarker
Mount Romance	Mount Lindesay	Narrikup
Scotsdale	Hay	Redmond West

Mount Lindesay is a rural locality of the Shire of Denmark in the Great Southern region of Western Australia. The Denmark River forms the locality's western boundary. Mount Lindesay is almost completely covered by the Mount Lindesay National Park and the actual mountain, Mount Lindesay, is located in the south-west of the locality.

Mount Lindesay is on the traditional land of the Noongar.

Despite its name, the heritage listed Mount Lindesay School Group 101, a one-teacher school from the Group Settlement Scheme era of the region, is located in neighbouring Scotsdale and not Mount Lindesay. It operated intermittently from 1926 to 1943, initially as the Group 101 School, until renamed to Mount Lindesay School in 1940.
