= Denbarker, Western Australia =

Locality in the Shire of Plantagenet, Western Australia

Denbarker
- other
- Coordinates: 34.68917°S 117.47890°E
- Country: Australia
- State: Western Australia
- LGA(s): Shire of Plantagenet
- Location: 343 km (213 mi) SE of Perth; 49 km (30 mi) NW of Albany; 17 km (11 mi) SW of Mount Barker

Government
  - State electorate(s): Warren-Blackwood
  - Federal division(s): O'Connor

Area
  - Total: 201 km^{2} (78 sq mi)

Population
  - Total(s): 93 (SAL 2021)
- Postcode: 6324
Localities around Denbarker
Perillup	Forest Hill	Mount Barker
Perillup	Denbarker	Mount Barker
Mount Lindesay	Mount Lindesay	Narrikup

Denbarker is a rural locality of the Shire of Plantagenet in the Great Southern region of Western Australia. Denbarker borders the Mount Roe National Park in the south-west and the Mount Lindesay National Park in the south.

Denbarker is located on the traditional land of the Menang people of the Noongar nation.

Like Rocky Gully and neighbouring Perillup, Denbarker was part of the soldier settlement scheme after the Second World War.
