= Woogenellup, Western Australia =

Locality in the Shire of Plantagenet, Western Australia

Woogenellup
- other
- Coordinates: 34.53722°S 117.89390°E
- Country: Australia
- State: Western Australia
- LGA(s): Shire of Plantagenet
- Location: 343 km (213 mi) SE of Perth; 55 km (34 mi) N of Albany; 22 km (14 mi) NE of Mount Barker

Government
  - State electorate(s): Warren-Blackwood
  - Federal division(s): O'Connor

Area
  - Total: 325.6 km^{2} (125.7 sq mi)

Population
  - Total(s): 116 (SAL 2021)
- Postcode: 6324
Localities around Woogenellup
Kendenup	Stirling Range NP	Stirling Range NP
Kendenup	Woogenellup	Takalarup
Mount Barker	Porongurup	Takalarup

Woogenellup, sometimes also spelled Woogenilup, is a rural locality of the Shire of Plantagenet in the Great Southern region of Western Australia. The eastern border of Woogenellup is formed by Chester Pass Road, while the southern boundary of the Stirling Range National Park forms its northern border. The Kalgan River runs through the locality from north-west to south-east, and the Kalgan Plains Nature Reserve is located within Woogenellup, south of the river.

Woogenellup is located on the traditional land of the Menang people of the Noongar nation.

== Nature reserve ==
The Kalgan Plains Nature Reserve was gazetted on 4 March 1960, has a size of 0.52 square kilometres (0.20 sq mi), and is located within the Mallee bioregion. The Corackerup Nature Reserve was gazetted on 17 May 1963, has a size of 43.34 square kilometres (16.73 sq mi), and is located within the Esperance Plains bioregion.
