= Narrikup, Western Australia =

Narrikup
- Town
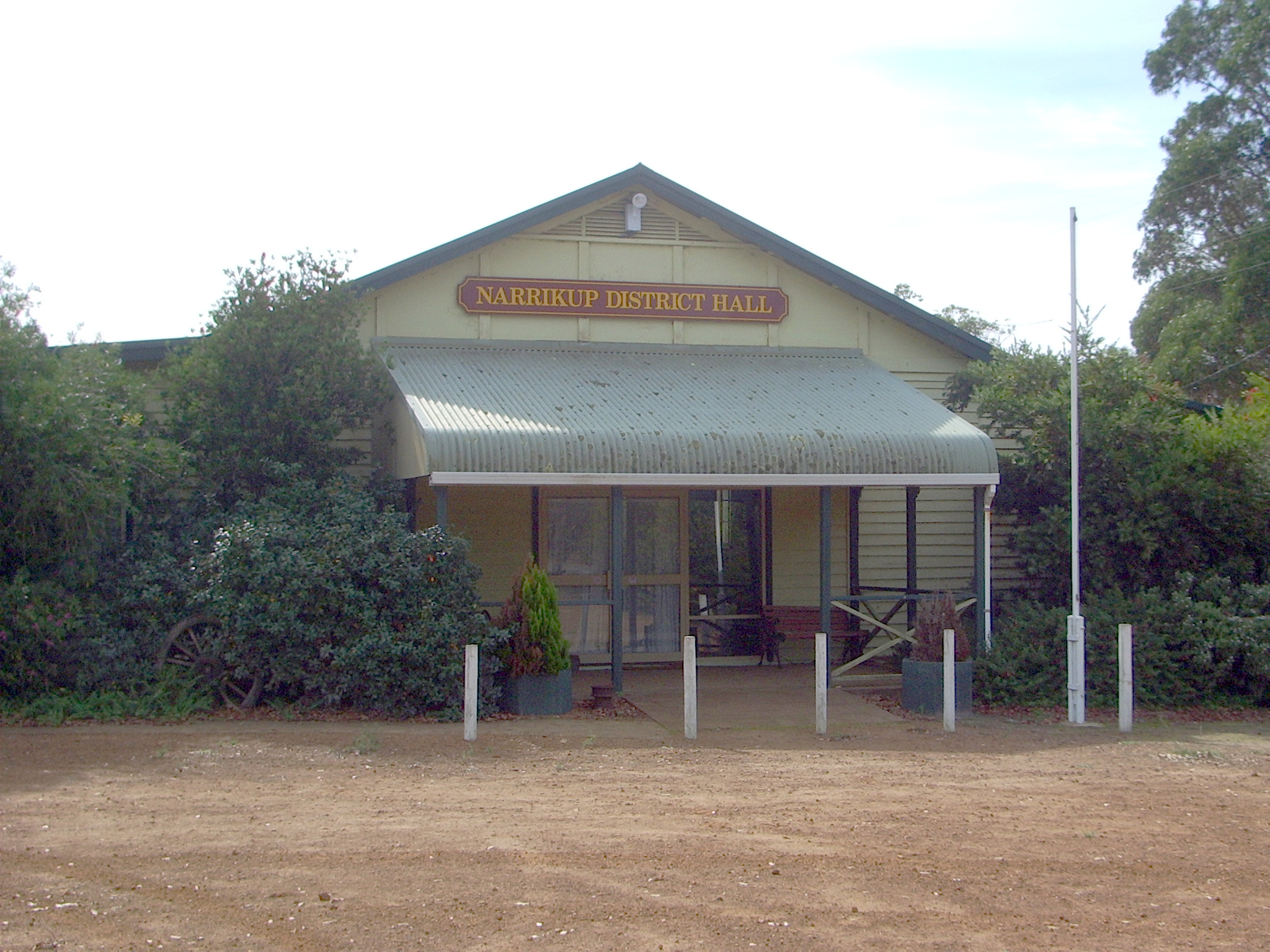
- Narrikup District Hall

- Interactive map of Narrikup
- Coordinates: 34.774°S 117.702°E
- Country: Australia
- State: Western Australia
- LGA: Shire of Plantagenet
- Location: 18 km (11 mi) S of Mount Barker; 32 km (20 mi) NW of Albany
- Established: 1900s

Government
  - State electorate: Warren-Blackwood
  - Federal division: O'Connor

Area
  - Total: 543.2 km^{2} (209.7 sq mi)

Population
  - Total: 514 (SAL 2021)
- Postcode: 6326
Localities around Narrikup
Denbarker	Mount Barker	Porongurup
Mount Lindesay	Narrikup	Napier
Redmond West	Redmond	Green Valley

Narrikup is a small town and locality of the Shire of Plantagenet in the Great Southern region of Western Australia. Narrikup is located between Albany and Mount Barker. At the 2006 census, Narrikup had a population of 515.

== History ==
The name Narrikup comes from the Aboriginal name of a nearby brook, which is thought to mean "place of abundance".

The area was visited by Thomas Wilson who travelled from Albany in 1829 when he camped on the banks of the stream west of the current townsite.

The town is located on the Great Southern Railway, line which was completed in this area in 1889, although initially the siding was named Hay River. Before the railway, nearby Chockerup Inn was a busy stop on the mail route from Albany to Perth, but it was abandoned when the railway came.

A reserve for the townsite was put aside in 1901, and in 1905 20 lots were surveyed; the townsite was gazetted in 1907.

== Nature reserves ==
A number of named and unnamed nature reserves are located within Narrikup, all located within the Jarrah Forest bioregion:

- Chorkerup Nature Reserve was gazetted on 26 August 2004 and has a size of 0.48 square kilometres (0.19 mi^{2})
- Lake Barnes Road Nature Reserve was gazetted on 22 January 1912 and has a size of 2.98 square kilometres (1.15 mi^{2})
- Lake Eyrie Nature Reserve was gazetted on 15 July 1898 and has a size of 0.4 square kilometres (0.15 mi^{2})
- Sleeman Creek Nature Reserve was gazetted on 3 October 1924 and has a size of 4.16 square kilometres (1.61 mi^{2})
- WA49722 Nature Reserve was gazetted on 2 December 2008 and has a size of 0.9 square kilometres (0.35 mi^{2})
- WA15775 Nature Reserve was gazetted on 27 November 1914 and has a size of 0.61 square kilometres (0.24 mi^{2})
