= Kendenup, Western Australia =

Kendenup
- Town
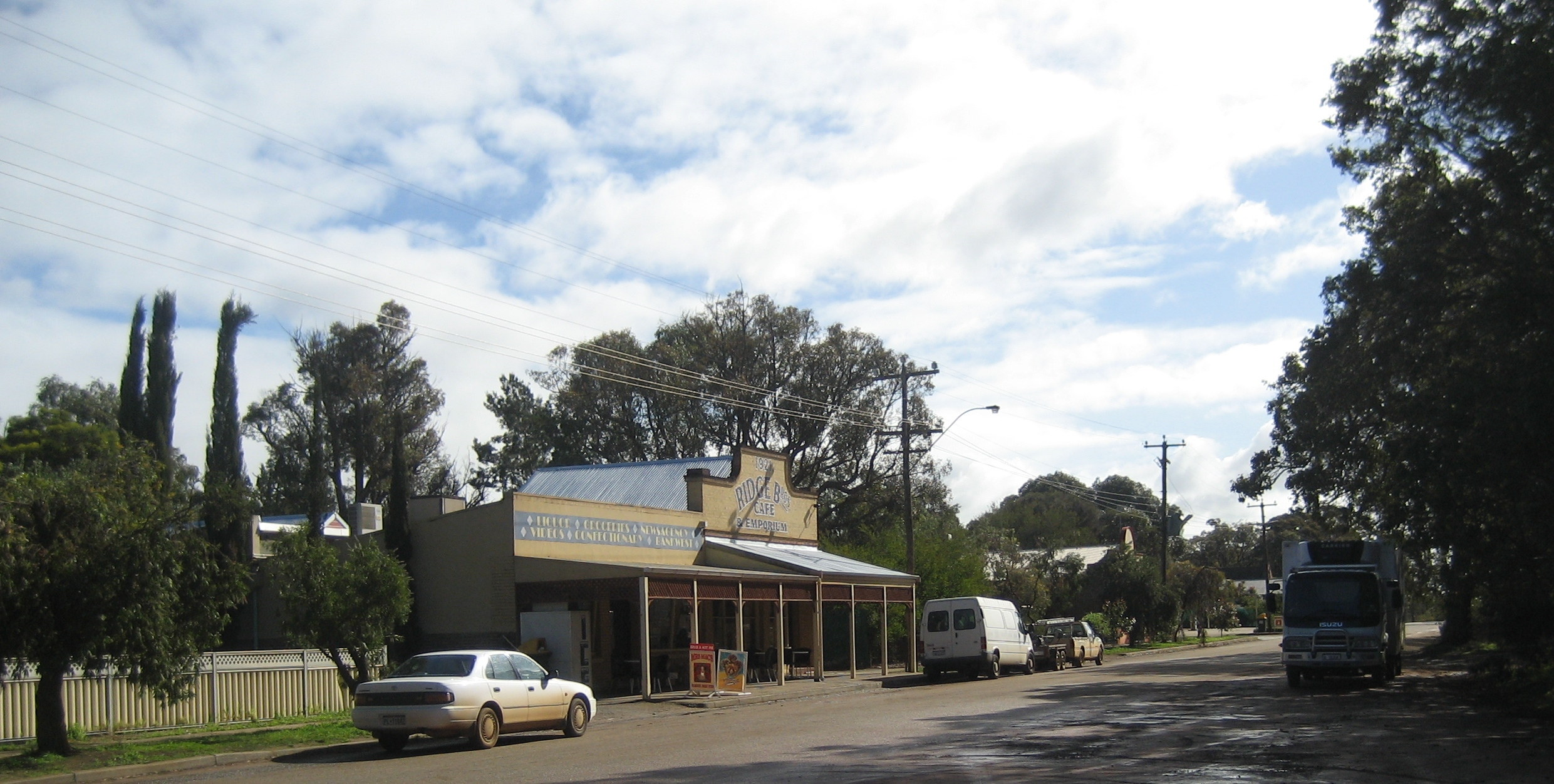
- Ridge Brothers general store, Hassell Avenue, Kendenup

- Interactive map of Kendenup
- Coordinates: 34.486°0′S 117.629°0′E
- Country: Australia
- State: Western Australia
- LGA: Shire of Plantagenet
- Location: 22 km (14 mi) N of Mount Barker; 90 km (56 mi) S of Katanning
- Established: 1840

Government
  - State electorate: Warren-Blackwood
  - Federal division: O'Connor

Area
  - Total: 388.3 km^{2} (149.9 sq mi)

Population
  - Total: 422 (UCL 2021)
- Postcode: 6323
Localities around Kendenup
Tenterden	Tenterden	Stirling Range NP
Perillup	Kendenup	Woogenellup
Forest Hill	Mount Barker	Mount Barker

Kendenup is a small town and locality in the Great Southern region of Western Australia, within the Shire of Plantagenet. It is known for its view of Porongurup Range and the Stirling Range. It is 345 kilometres (214 mi) south east of Perth and 22 kilometres (14 mi) north of Mount Barker. The Great Southern Railway (established 1889) passes through the town, which is one of the original stations on the line. At the 2006 census, Kendenup had a population of 1,290.

The town was once the centre of a vast sheep station, and was, in the early years of the Western Australian colony, one of the largest farming enterprises so far established.

At the time of the first European discovery, the area was known to the local Aboriginal people as "Moor-ilup". "Kendenup" is another local indigenous word that was used to describe the area.

The upper reach of the Kalgan River runs nearby.

== History ==
=== Early European settlement ===
Alexander Collie led an expedition from King George's Sound (Albany) in April and May 1831 accompanied by the Noongar man Mokare. The expedition commenced by journeying up the Kalgan River and overland to the base of the Porongorups. Collie was granted 2,000 hectares (5,000 acres) in the Kendenup area having been satisfied with its agricultural potential.

Other early land grants in the district were made to:

- John Lawrence Morley, 1,600 hectares (4,000 acres)
- Lieutenant William Preston, 810 hectares (2,000 acres)
- George Cheyne, 7,700 hectares (19,000 acres) at "Location 27"
- in June 1830, Captain Thomas Banister, 2,389 hectares (5,903 acres)

In 1838, Captain John Hassell sailed from England en route to Van Diemen's Land in the Dawson, intending to settle on a 200-hectare (500-acre) grant on the Tamar River. Running low on water, he stopped at King George Sound in Albany where he met with the Government Resident, Sir Richard Spencer who persuaded him to consider acquiring land in the vicinity. Hassell ultimately purchased George Cheyne's Location 27 and after returning to Hobart and New South Wales, arrived back at Albany on 6 March 1840 in the China which he had chartered for the purpose. His stock included 800 sheep, 12 cattle and 10 horses from New South Wales which he walked overland to establish a homestead and farm which he called "Kendenup". Hassell, who was known widely as Captain Hassell, acquired further properties and by 1850 had expanded the operation to 10,000 hectares (25,000 acres) freehold and 15,000 hectares (38,000 acres) leased.

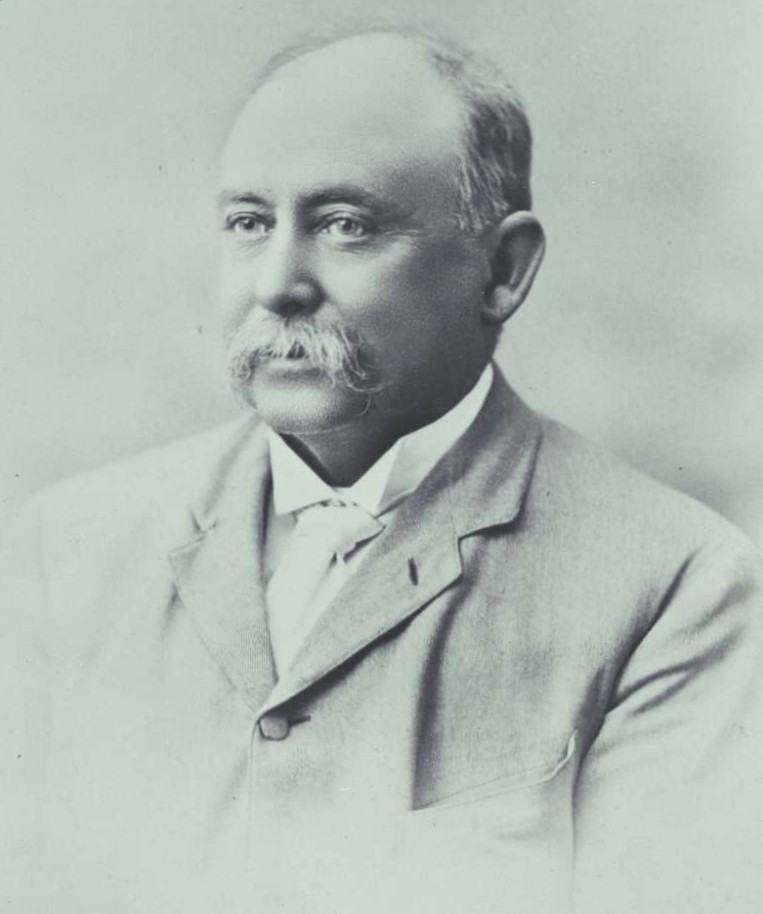
Albert Young Hassell (1841–1918), second of five sons of Captain John Hassell

Hassell's partner and brother-in-law was Frederick Boucher who had established the British and Australian Bank in London in 1838. The bank failed in 1841 and as Boucher's assets were tied in with the collapse, Hassell found himself having to work closely with the bank's trustees as partners. Lieutenant Peter Belches was appointed as the bank's trustees agent to realise on Boucher's assets.

After establishing the farm, Hassell lived mainly in Albany using managers to run the day-to-day operations on the station. In Albany he ran an import/export business which included managing the farm's wool sales to England. He travelled to Kendenup regularly to oversee the business. The Kendenup wool won many awards.

In 1856 the family settled at Kendenup. Captain Hassell's two eldest sons, John Frederick Tasman Hassell and Albert Young Hassell, took control of operations and later married and settled there with their own families. Several homesteads and buildings were built to accommodate the families, some of which still stand and are listed and protected for their heritage value.

In the early 1870s the station boasted 30,000 sheep.

J. F. T. Hassell left the property to live in Albany in about 1871/72 followed by Albert who ran the farm until 1886. Captain Hassell died on 15 August 1883, survived by his wife, five sons and a daughter. The property stagnated for the next 30 or so years, with J. F. T. Hassell attempting to sell it 1909. He died in 1919.

=== Gold ===
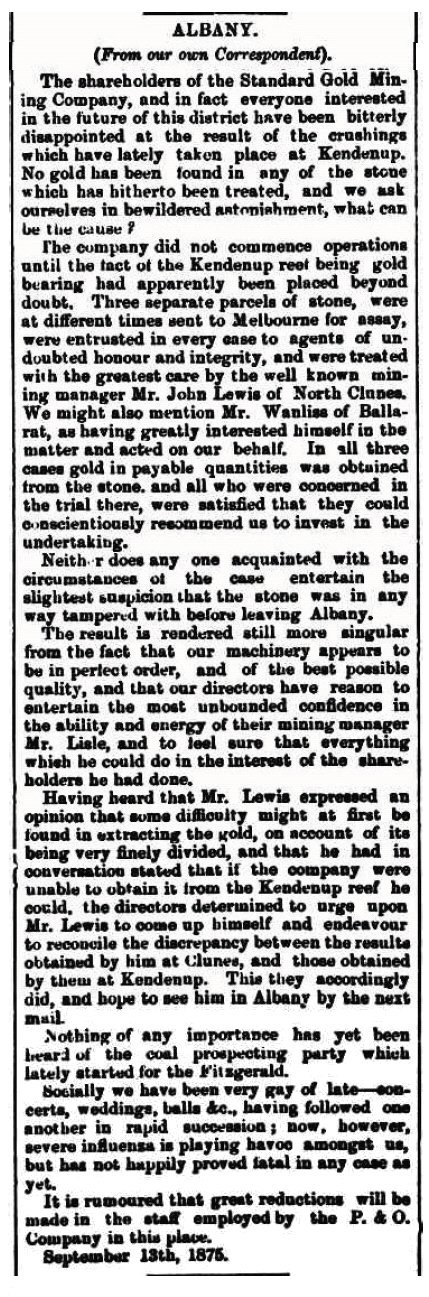
Report of discovery and disappointment, from The Western Australian Times, 21 September 1875

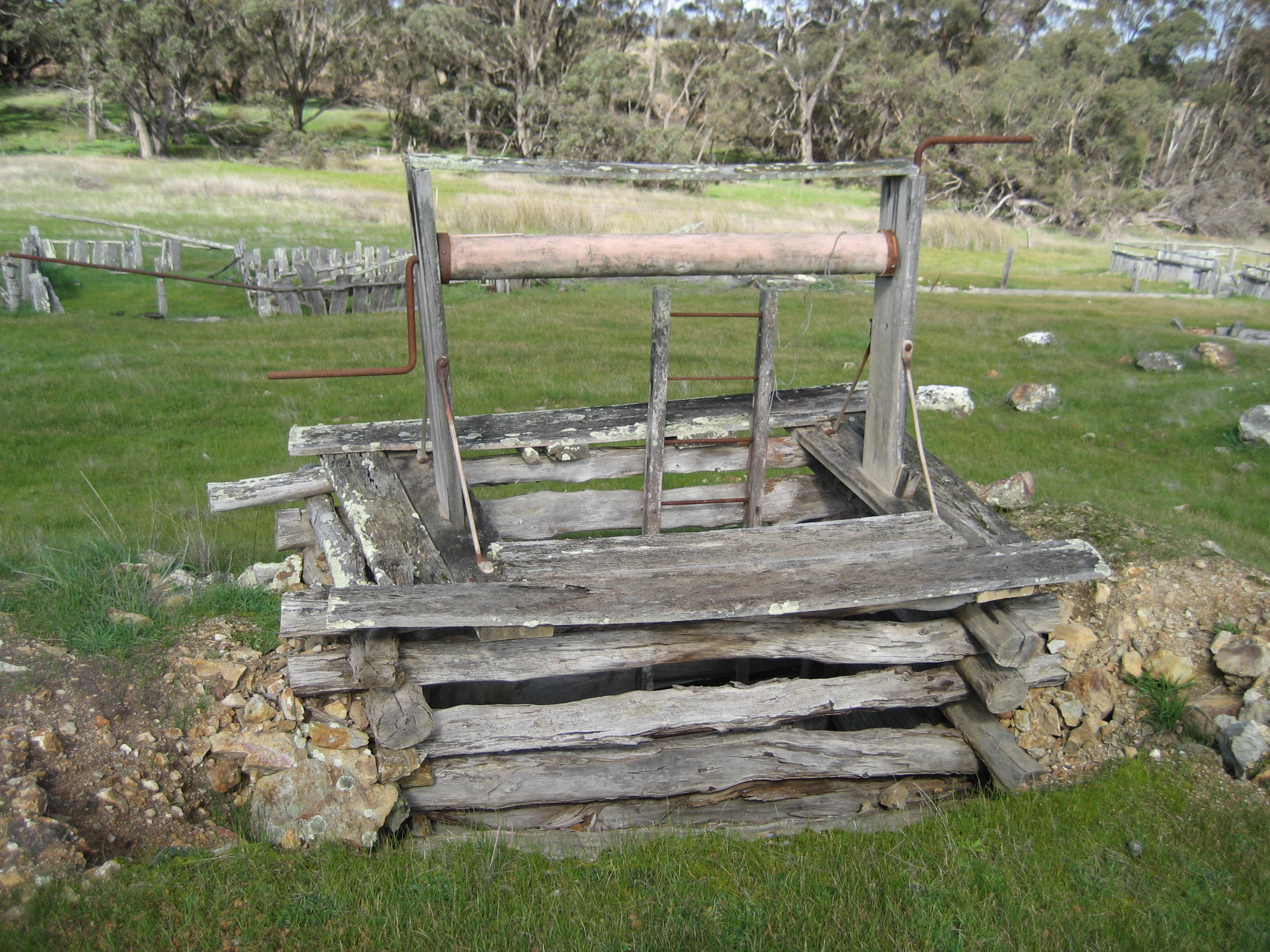
Remains of the old gold mine on Jellicoe Road, south of the townsite

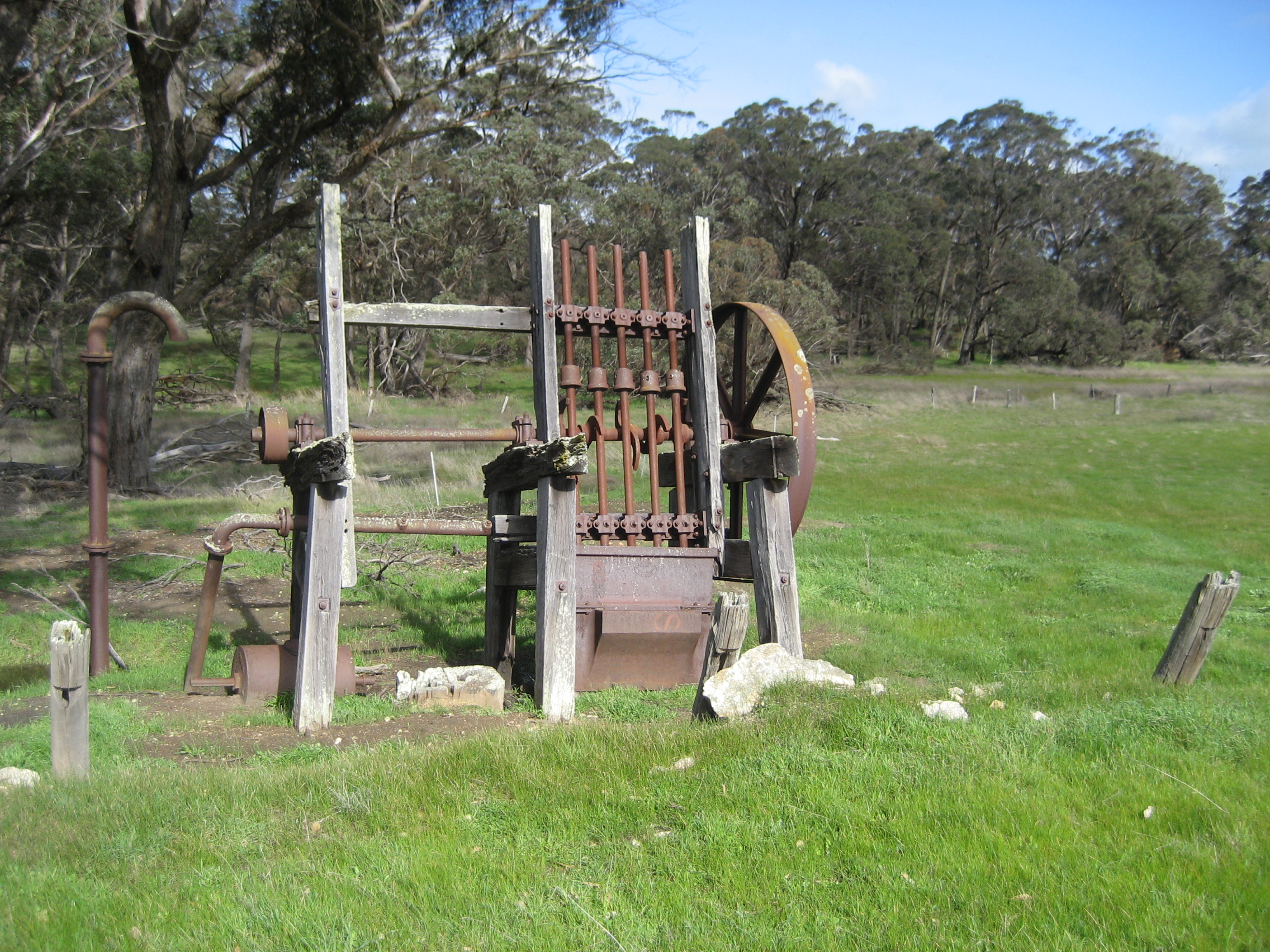
Battery nearby, used for crushing the ore

On 20 July 1869, the Government of Western Australia offered a payment of £5,000 in the Government Gazette for the discovery of payable gold. Hassell submitted stone samples from Kendenup in 1872 and was told that they were gold bearing. A five-ton consignment was sent to Victoria for crushing and returned four ounces of gold.

Encouraged by the prospects, the Standard Gold Mining Company was registered on 15 December 1874, with a capital of £3,000. A mine about 2 kilometres (1.2 mi) south of the town with a nearby five-stamp battery were built. The operation became the first to start mining in the state. However, recoveries failed to live up to expectations and the battery crushed only ten tons of ore before being closed when the company went into voluntary liquidation on 5 June 1876.

The mine and battery are still visible, although in poor condition.

=== 1920 De Garis settlement ===
While in Adelaide in July 1920, rural entrepreneur Jack De Garis had heard that the Kendenup property was for sale by the Hassell family executors for £47,325, or £1 per acre. He offered £45,000 with a £1,000 deposit which was accepted, the offer being made prior to his inspection of the property. After having satisfied himself with an inspection De Garis proceeded with his plan of subdividing it into approximately 60-acre (24 ha) lots, selling the lots through the sale of debentures to settlers to the value of £150,000 using a closer settlement model. He also purchased Kendenup East, a 6,200-acre (2,500 ha) property which included a homestead and a 50-acre (20 ha) orchard, for another £1,000.

The "DeGaris Kendenup W.A. Development Company" was set up as the debenture issuer. De Garis planned for subdivision of the estate with a townsite which would include an administrative and civic centre, public parks, recreation areas, factory areas, a school and church sites. A dehydrating factory under the name of Kendenup Fruit Packing Company was established to pack farm produce for the community at a cost of £4,000.

He promoted the scheme around Australia, and from late 1920 settlers started to arrive and were granted farm blocks of between 10 and 60 acres (4.0 and 24.3 ha) on the purchase of ten-year interest-free debenture notes to grow fruit, vegetables and other farm produce. However, the project was under capitalised and lot sizes were considered to be too small to be fully viable and after a peak of about 350 families settling, debenture sales dried up.

In August 1922 De Garis travelled to the United States to raise urgently needed capital. The following classified advertisement was published in the New York Times on 13 August 1922.

PROGRESS IN AUSTRALIA.
Growth of Kendenup an Example of What Can Be Done There.

"When railway revenue jumps from $250 to $50,000 in twelve months it is enough make people to take an interest in the cause of such a phenomenal effect", said C. J. De Garis of Kendenup, Australia, in explaining the wonderful development of his section of Australia in which he is vastly interested. Mr. De Garis, who is at the Hotel Pennsylvania, holds the long distance record for aviation.

"We are most enthusiastic about our settlement of Kendenup, for those are the figures we can show for the last twelve months", said Mr De Garis. "For eighty-two years it was a sheep ranch, a tract of land comprising about fifty thousand acres, with a total population of seven people. That was sixteen months ago and the change today is unbelievable. It is now a model community of 200 houses, built of brick and concrete with tiled roofs, and the population has increased to 770 inhabitants.

"It is because Kendenup settlement has been such a success that I have come to America to interest the capitalists of your country in creating similar settlements throughout Australia. The financial success of the settlement is the best argument that I have and a shrewd captain of industry, will be quick to recognize it at once. Another strong point is the fact that 100 per cent. of the settlers made an unsolicited statement to the people of Australia that they were absolutely satisfied with their bargain.

"We who are interested in and responsible for this settlement have spared no pains to give the best that can be obtained. We have had the soil analyzed by experts; have ascertained what fruits and vegetables are best suited for that particular type of soil, and we have established a dehydrator for extracting moisture from the fruit which makes it imperishable.

"The system which we used in disposing of the land in our settlement of Kendenup was to cut it up into thirty-acre tracts. Seventy dollars is the average price paid an acre. The payments are extended equally over a period of ten years without interest. The climate of Australia is remarkably fine. We have not had a month without rain in forty years. The average rainfall each year is about thirty inches. Australia is a great country, and we want as many real Americans as we can get to come and settle there permanently."

$250,000 was promised but never materialised.

By 1923, the scheme had effectively collapsed with the company going into voluntary liquidation. About 30 families stayed on. In order to remain on their selections the Kendenup Settlers Association (Inc.) took up the fight. The government established a Royal Commission 'to inquire into and report upon the establishment of the settlement at Kendenup', headed by Commissioner William Grogan. Fraud by De Garis had been alleged prior to the Royal Commission but he was exonerated in the findings. A second Royal Commission headed by barrister Ross McDonald was held to look into the difficulties faced by the settlers and possible assistance which could be offered. Changes to the Act which governed the Agricultural Bank of Western Australia were made as a result. McDonald later worked pro bono on the settlers' behalf to negotiate with creditors and the banks to enable them to purchase additional land and transfer the debentures to conventional mortgages.

Despite the setbacks, the settlement had provided much of the infrastructure for the current Kendenup township.

=== Internment camp ===
During World War II the town was the site of an internment camp housing 200 Italian prisoners of war. The camp operated from 4 November 1943 to 23 May 1946. Internees were assigned as labourers to farms in the area.

== Facilities ==
The town has the Kendenup Primary School (established 1921).

Businesses nearby and within the town include Ridge Brothers store (liquor store, bakery, gifts and general goods), the local Kendenup post office, scattered wineries and accommodation options such as a lodge and several bed and breakfast establishments.

The early homestead buildings are intact but on private property and therefore unavailable for inspection. The old mine and its battery are about 2 km south of the townsite on Jellicoe Road off Albany Highway.

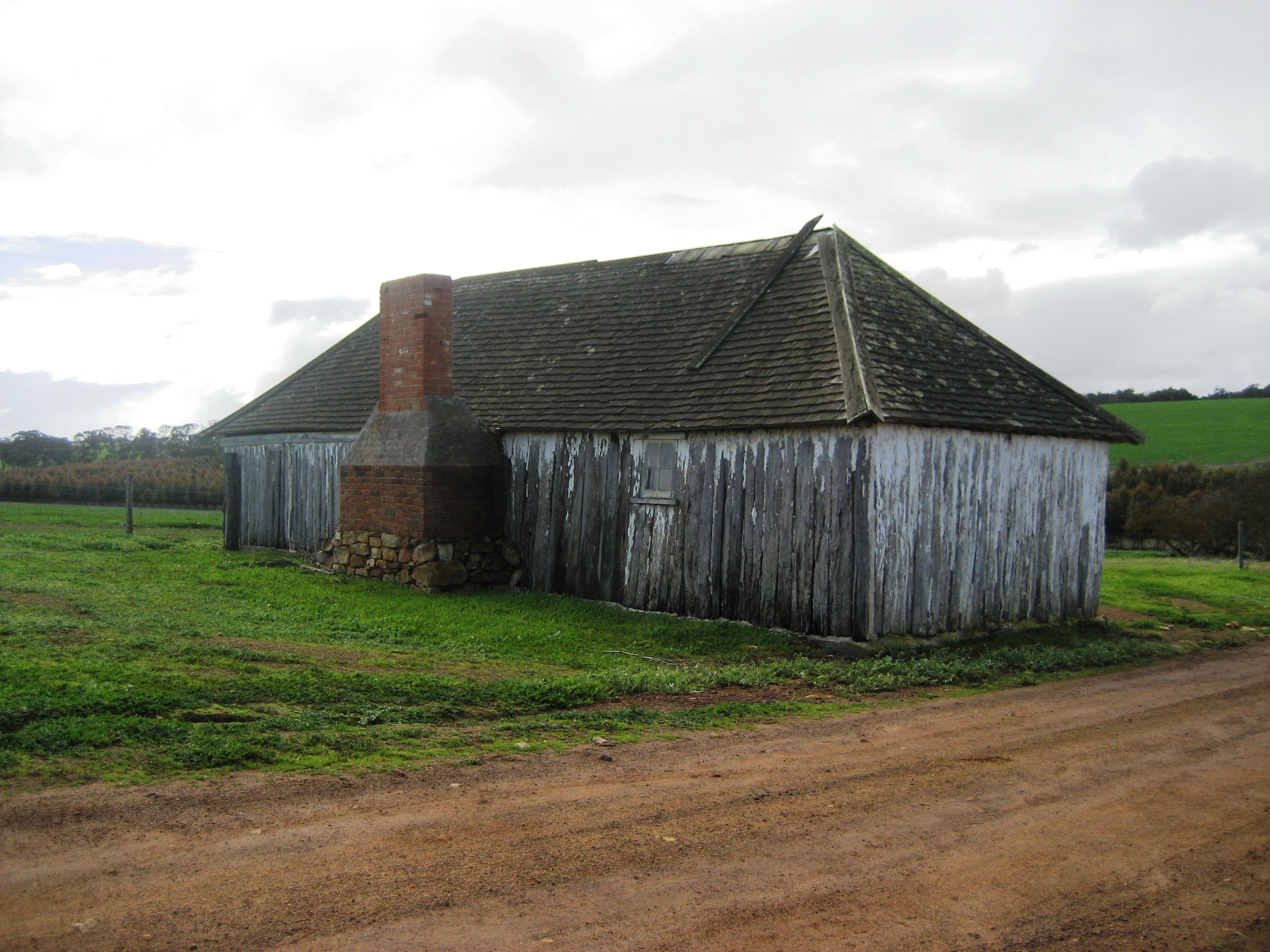
Timber slab and shingle farmhouse built by John Hassell

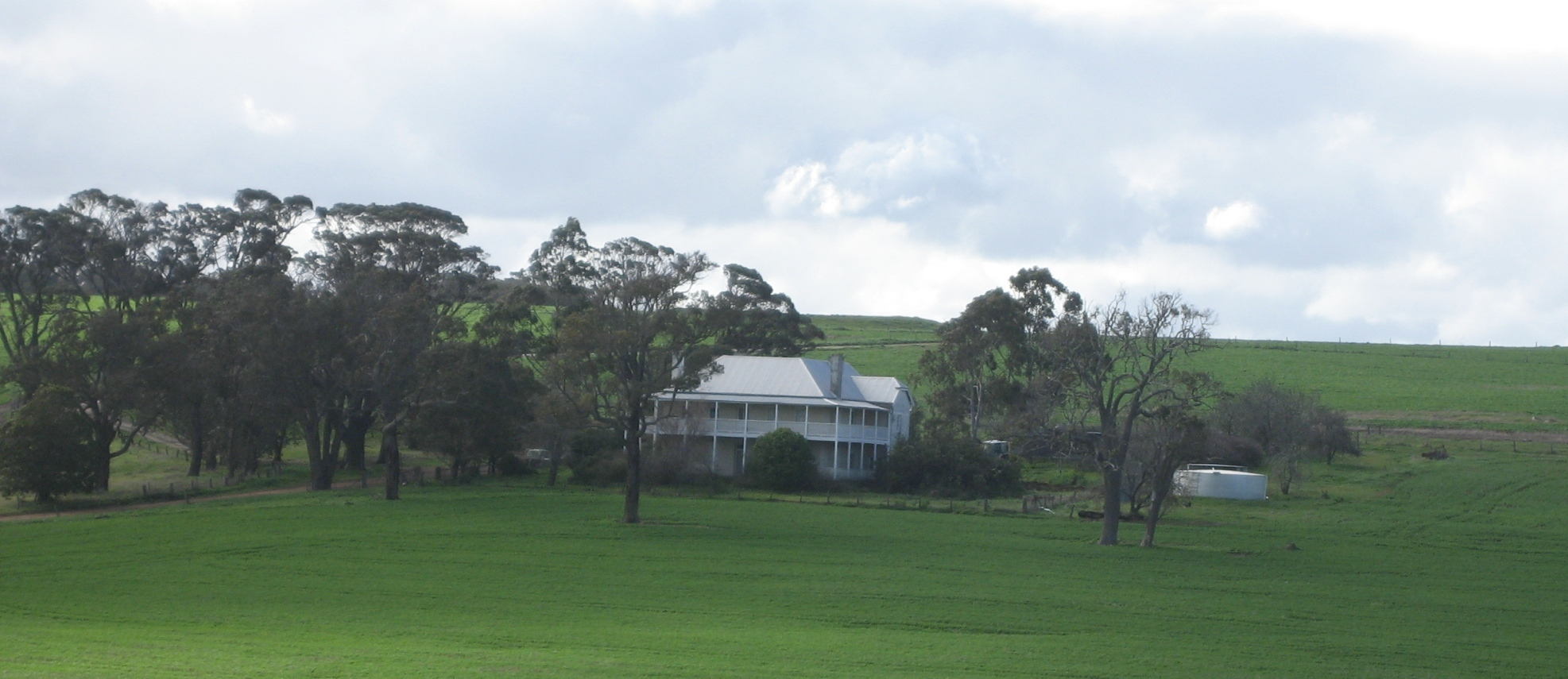
Hassell family homestead

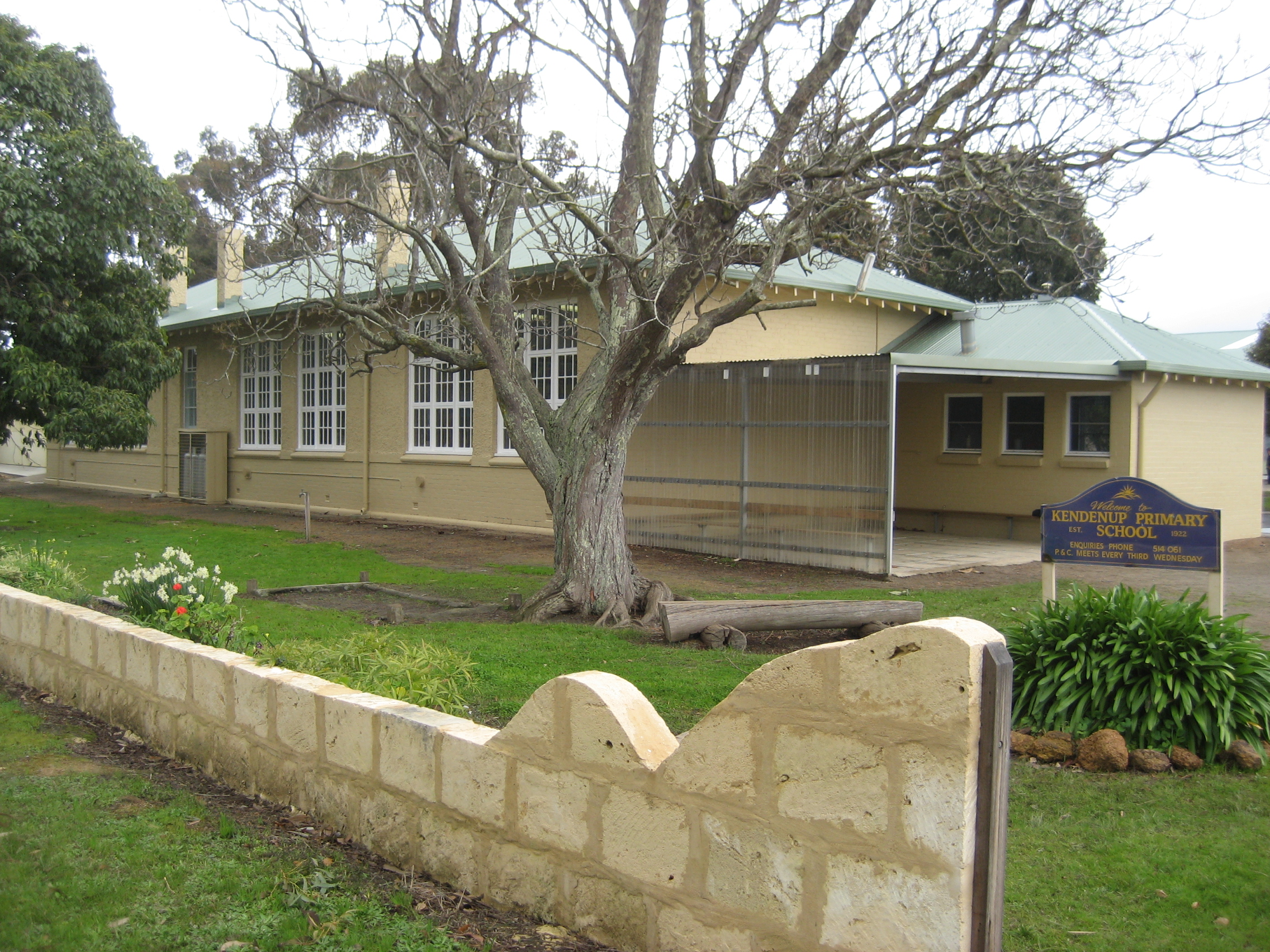
Primary school

== Climate ==
Kendenup has a temperate climate with warm to hot summers and mild to cold winters. While summer temperatures can exceed 40 °C (104 °F), the average is around 26 °C (79 °F). Overnight temperatures can drop below 0 °C (32 °F) in winter but daytime winter temperatures average 10–13 °C (50–55 °F).

Rainfall averages from around 24 millimetres (1 in) per month in January to over 100 millimetres (4 in) in July.

Kendenup recorded 125.8 millimetres (4.95 in) of rainfall in the 24 hours to 9am on 2 April 2005.

== Notable residents ==
- Rica Erickson, naturalist and author
