= Redmond, Western Australia =

Town in the City of Albany, Western Australia

Redmond
- Town
- Coordinates: 34°53′00″S 117°41′00″E
- Country: Australia
- State: Western Australia
- LGA: City of Albany
- Location: 399 km (248 mi) south south east of Perth; 26 km (16 mi) north west of Albany
- Established: 1916

Government
  - State electorate: Albany
  - Federal division: O'Connor

Area
  - Total: 121.4 km^{2} (46.9 sq mi)
- Elevation: 94 m (308 ft)

Population
  - Total: 208 (SAL 2021)
- Postcode: 6327

Redmond is a town and locality of the City of Albany in the Great Southern region of Western Australia. It is located 399 km south-south-east of Perth and the closest populated town is Albany.

The town began when a railway siding was opened in the area in 1912 which was initially called Mulikupp. The townsite was later renamed to Redmond. In 1913 blocks were subdivided and by 1916 a school had been built and the town was gazetted. It is thought that the town was named after the Irish Nationalist leader, John Edward Redmond. A sawmill was established near the town along Albany Highway in 1997 by the Gatti brothers that specialised in local hardwoods such as jarrah, marri and wandoo to make floorboards, decking and structural timber. The mill was sold to C.J. Matters in 2015.
