= Shire of Plantagenet =

Coordinates: 34°37′48″S 117°40′01″E

- Local government area
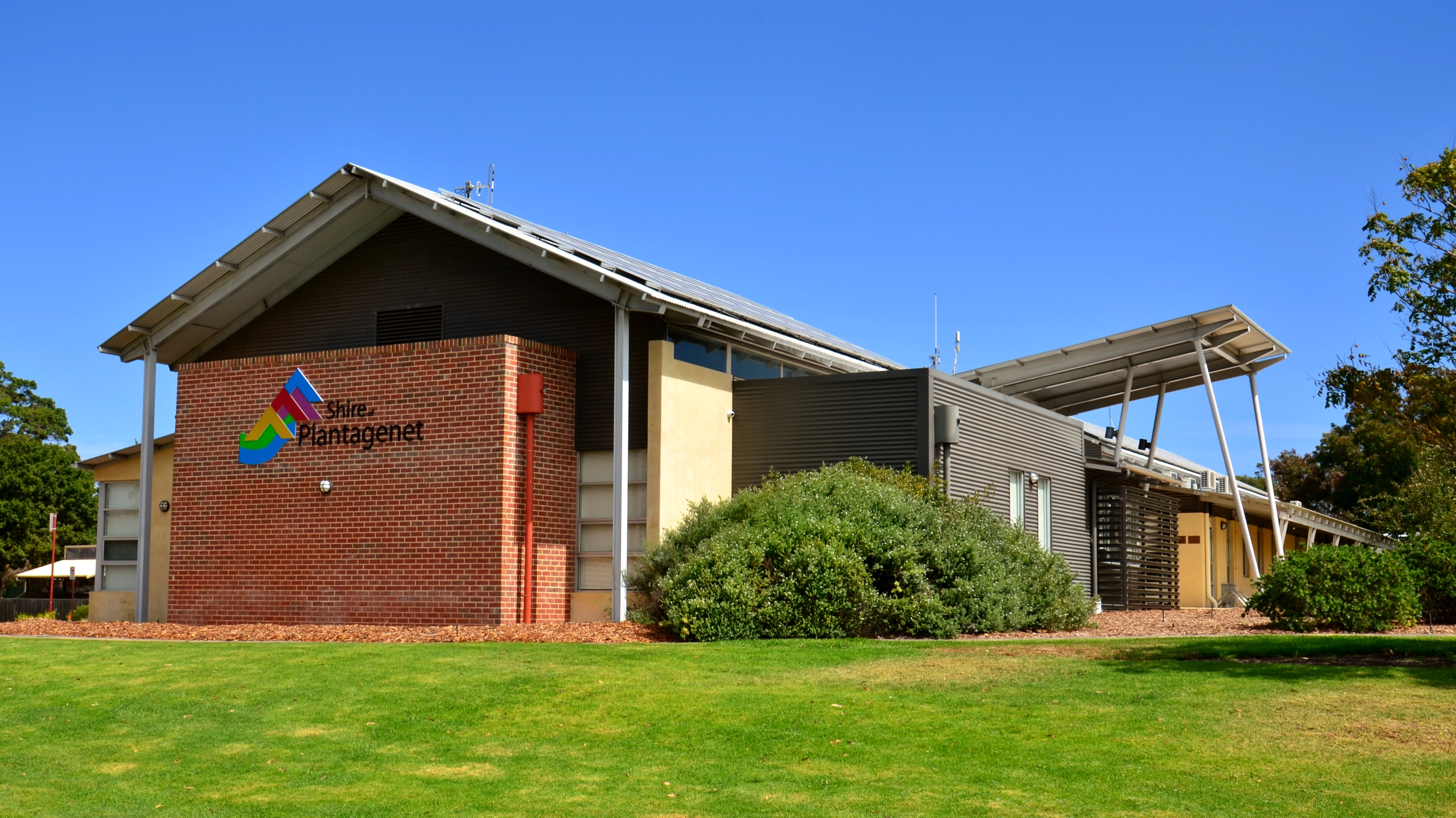
- Plantagenet shire offices, 2018

- Interactive map of Shire of Plantagenet
- Country: Australia
- State: Western Australia
- Region: Great Southern
- Established: 1871
- Council seat: Mount Barker

Government
  - Shire President: Len Handasyde
  - State electorate: Albany
  - Federal division: O'Connor

Area
  - Total: 4,792 km^{2} (1,850 sq mi)

Population
  - Total: 5,388 (LGA 2021)
- Website: Shire of Plantagenet
LGAs around Shire of Plantagenet
Manjimup	Cranbrook	Gnowangerup
Manjimup	Shire of Plantagenet	Albany
Denmark	Albany	Albany

The Shire of Plantagenet is a local government area in the Great Southern region of Western Australia, managed from the town of Mount Barker, 360 kilometres (224 mi) south of Perth and 50 kilometres (31 mi) north of Albany. The shire covers an area of 4,792 square kilometres (1,850 sq mi) and includes the communities of Narrikup, Rocky Gully, Kendenup and Porongurup.

The region is noted for agriculture, principally wheat, sheep (wool and meat), beef cattle, wine, canola and olives. Silviculture, especially plantations of Tasmanian blue gums (Eucalyptus globulus), was a major industry in the shire although some recent silviculture enterprises (Great Southern Plantations and Timbercorp) have gone into receivership. Local tourist attractions include the Porongurup Range and Stirling Range, a museum based within the original police station, as well as other pioneer structures such as St Werburgh's Chapel.

== History ==
The Plantagenet Road District was gazetted on 24 January 1871 as one of 18 elected boards to manage roads and services in Western Australia, and initially included a reasonably large section of the Great Southern region. On 1 July 1961, it became the Shire of Plantagenet following the enactment of the Local Government Act 1960, which reformed all remaining road districts into shires.

== Indigenous people ==
The Shire of Plantagenet is located on the traditional land of the Minang people of the Noongar nation.

== Wards ==
The Shire was redivided into five wards in 2001. The shire president is elected from amongst the councillors.

- East Ward (two councillors)
- Kendenup Ward (one councillor)
- Rocky Gully/West Ward (two councillors)
- South Ward (one councillor)
- Town Ward (three councillors)

== Towns and localities ==
The towns and localities of the Shire of Plantagenet with population and size figures based on the most recent Australian census:

Locality	Population	Area	Map
Denbarker	93 (SAL 2021)	201 km^{2} (78 sq mi)	
Forest Hill	143 (SAL 2021)	206.2 km^{2} (79.6 sq mi)	
Kendenup	1,062 (SAL 2021)	388.3 km^{2} (149.9 sq mi)	
Mount Barker	2,855 (SAL 2021)	489.2 km^{2} (188.9 sq mi)	
Narrikup	514 (SAL 2021)	543.2 km^{2} (209.7 sq mi)	
Perillup	46 (SAL 2016)	691.4 km^{2} (267.0 sq mi)	
Porongurup	342 (SAL 2021)	212.1 km^{2} (81.9 sq mi)	
Rocky Gully	92 (SAL 2021)	883.3 km^{2} (341.0 sq mi)	
Stirling Range National Park * ‡	0 (SAL 2021)	1,121 km^{2} (433 sq mi)	
Takalarup	127 (SAL 2021)	441.1 km^{2} (170.3 sq mi)	
Woogenellup	116 (SAL 2021)	325.6 km^{2} (125.7 sq mi)	

- ( * indicates locality is only partially located within this shire)
- ( ‡ indicates boundaries of national park and locality are not identical)

== Infrastructure ==
The shire has ownership and responsibility of the Great Southern Saleyards, a state-of-the-art facility that was built following the closure of the Mount Barker Saleyards and the Albany Town Saleyards, and joint development by both councils around 2002. Due to cost issues, the City of Albany sought to dispose of its share of the facility, and an agreement was made to transfer full ownership and responsibility to the Shire of Plantagenet.

The Mount Barker Power Company Pty Ltd has constructed slightly to the north of the township a three Enercon turbine 73m high windfarm costing $8.3 million. The turbines are on private land and this development is a private energy generation selling power into the state grid. The windfarm is one of the very few to have been completed to service a local community's power needs since the government of Western Australia set a renewable energy target. The site is on private property and is projected to generate about 8,400 megawatt hours of electricity each year from three 800 kilowatt turbines.

== Services ==
The Shire of Plantagenet provides the usual services that Western Australian local governments would supply. Rubbish collection is provided by Warren Blackwood Waste. A rubbish tip is located on O'Neill Road south of Mount Barker and transfer stations are at Kendenup, Porongurup and Narrikup.

Ranger Services and a Community Emergency Services Manager (CESM) are based in the Shire Office in Mount Barker. The CESM assists the local bushfire brigades and State Emergency Service unit. The bushfire brigades are located at Porongurup, Porongurup South, Narrikup, Narpyn, Kendenup, Woogenellup, Rocky Gully, Perrilup, Denbarker, Forest Hill and Middle Ward. South Stirling's brigade works closely with the Plantagenet Shire but is registered with Albany City Council.

A Local Emergency Management Committee and a Roadwise Committee are just two examples of how the Shire engages with the community.

== Heritage-listed places ==
As of 2023, 74 places are heritage-listed in the Shire of Plantagenet, of which six are on the State Register of Heritage Places.

== See also ==
- Electoral district of Plantagenet
