= Muir Highway =

Highway in Western Australia

Coordinates: 34.38311°S 116.45027°E

Muir Highway Western Australia
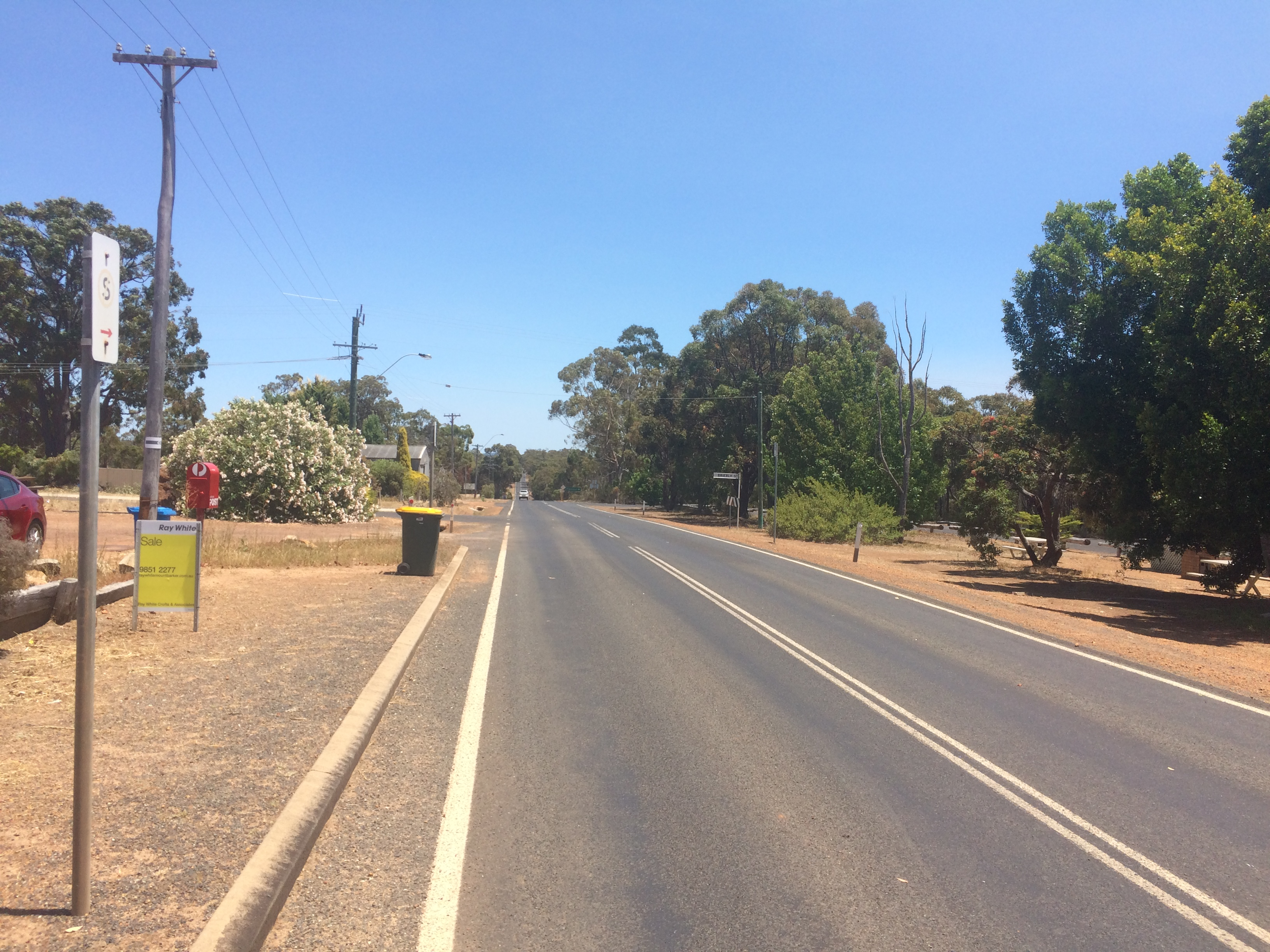
- Muir Highway at Rocky Gully

General information
- Type: Highway
- Length: 161 km (100 mi)
- Route number(s): State Route 102

Major junctions
- West end: South Western Highway (National Route 1), Manjimup, Western Australia
- Rocky Gully–Frankland Road; Denmark–Mount Barker Road
- East end: Albany Highway (State Route 30), Mount Barker, Western Australia

Location(s)
- Major settlements: Lake Muir, Rocky Gully

Highway system
- Highways in Australia; National Highway • Freeways in Australia; Highways in Western Australia

Muir Highway, also called Muirs Highway, is a Western Australian highway linking Manjimup and Mount Barker, which is on the Albany Highway. It is signed as State Route 102 and is 161 kilometres (100 mi) long. It provides a shorter distance between the cities of Bunbury and Albany. It is a lowly populated highway passing mostly through karri and jarrah with occasional areas of farmland.

One village, Rocky Gully lies on the highway, although it also passes through the localities of Dingup, Nyamup, Lake Muir, Strachan and Murtinup.

It is primarily used as a freight route for plantation timber trucks and interstate long vehicles servicing the horticultural areas of the South West. The road is a two way, single carriageway bitumen surfaced highway.

Muir Highway was named after brothers Thomas and John Muir, the first European settlers in the Warren district, who settled at Deeside in 1852 and built a rush hut there in 1856.

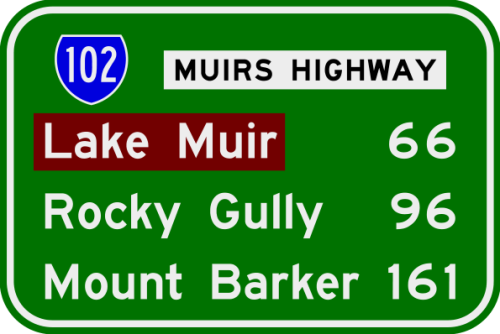

== Major intersections ==
LGA	Location	km	mi	Destinations	Notes
Manjimup	Manjimup	0	0.0	South Western Highway (National Route 1) – Bunbury, Bridgetown, Walpole, Albany	Western terminus at roundabout. Continues west as Pritchard Street
Plantagenet	Rocky Gully	95	59	Rocky Gully–Frankland Road – Frankland River, Kojonup	
Plantagenet	Mount Barker	149	93	Denmark-Mount Barker Road – Denbarker, Denmark	
Plantagenet	Mount Barker	161	100	Albany Highway (State Route 30) – Perth, Kojonup, Cranbrook, Albany	Eastern terminus at roundabout. Continues east as Woogenellup Road
1.000 mi = 1.609 km; 1.000 km = 0.621 mi

== See also ==
- Highways in Australia
- List of highways in Western Australia
