= Mount Barker, Western Australia =

Mount Barker Pwakkenbak (Nyungar)
- Town
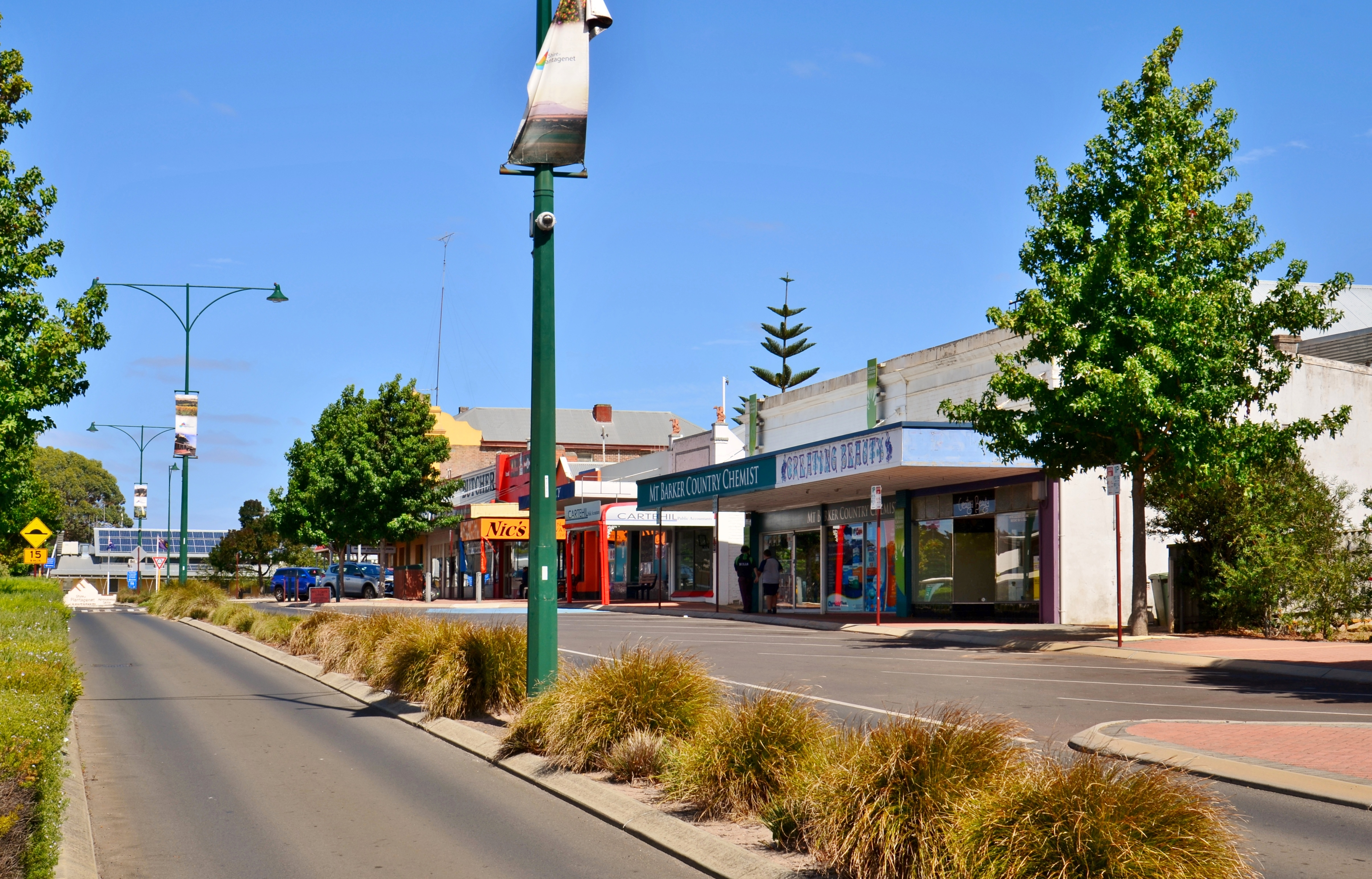
- Lowood Road, Mount Barker, 2018

- Interactive map of Mount Barker
- Coordinates: 34°37′48″S 117°40′01″E
- Country: Australia
- State: Western Australia
- LGA: Shire of Plantagenet
- Location: 360 km (220 mi) from Perth; 50 km (31 mi) from Albany
- Established: 1892

Government
  - State electorate: Albany
  - Federal division: O'Connor

Area
  - Total: 489.2 km^{2} (188.9 sq mi)
- Elevation: 300 m (980 ft)

Population
  - Total: 1,898 (UCL 2021)
- Postcode: 6324
- Mean max temp: 20.1 °C (68.2 °F)
- Mean min temp: 9.4 °C (48.9 °F)
- Annual rainfall: 728.5 mm (28.68 in)
Localities around Mount Barker
Kendenup	Kendenup	Woogenellup
Forest Hill	Mount Barker	Porongurup
Denbarker	Narrikup	Porongurup

Mount Barker is a town and locality on Albany Highway, and the administrative centre of the Shire of Plantagenet in the Great Southern region of Western Australia. At the 2021 census, Mount Barker had a population of 2,855.

The town was named after the nearby hill, which in turn was named in 1829 by Thomas Braidwood Wilson in honour of Captain Collet Barker, who was in command of Western Australia's original British settlement at King George's Sound from 1829 to 1831.

== Location ==
Mount Barker is situated on Albany Highway, 363 kilometres (226 mi) southeast of Perth and 50 kilometres (31 mi) north of the city of Albany. The coastal town of Denmark is around 55 kilometres (34 mi) by road to the southwest via the Denmark to Mount Barker Road. The timber town of Manjimup is 160 kilometres (99 mi) west of Mount Barker, via Muir Highway. The Hay River, which flows into Wilson Inlet at Denmark, begins its journey just west of Mount Barker.

== History ==
Prior to European settlement, small groups of Aboriginal people, the Bibulman, followed seasonal movement patterns through the region. The Aboriginal name for Mount Barker Hill is Pwakkenbak.

In December 1829, Mount Barker was named after Captain Collet Barker, commandant of the garrison at King George Sound, by naval ship's surgeon Thomas Braidwood Wilson. Wilson explored the area in company with the Noongar man Mokare from King George Sound, John Kent (officer in charge of the Commissariat at Frederick Town, King George Sound), two convicts and Private William Gough of the 39th Regiment, while his ship Governor Phillip was being repaired.

European settlement of the Hay River area commenced around the 1830s and the opening of the Perth/Albany Railway in 1889 helped to ensure the town's future; the first store opened in 1890. Population growth continued through the 1890s and the first school and the town hall were opened in 1893. The population of the town was 326 (183 males and 143 females) in 1898.

== Industry ==
Apple orchards were once one of the major industries in the region and thrived until the mid-1960s. Today, viticulture, wheat, canola, plantation timber, sheep and cattle are some of the main agricultural activities still carried out around Mount Barker.

The Plantagenet Shire owns and operates the Great Southern Regional Cattle Saleyards that provide services to cattle producers from within and outside the shire.

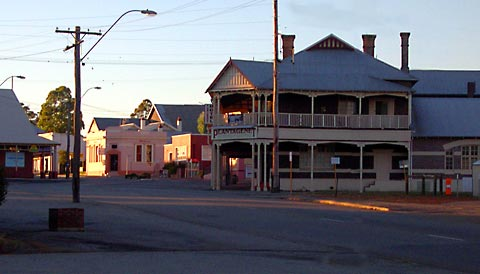
Plantagenet Hotel, Lowood Road

Mount Barker is also home to The Banksia Farm which boasts one of every known species of Banksia and most species of Dryandra.

The Stirling and Porongurup Range National Parks are located within the Plantagenet Shire and these, together with the local premium wine industry, have contributed to the growth of tourism in and around Mount Barker.

Available accommodation includes motels, a caravan park and a number of bed and breakfast establishments and farm-stays in the surrounding area.

There has been a steady growth of hobby farming around the town and throughout the shire as people abandon city-life for a "tree change". This has seen a corresponding increase in cottage industries offering a range of art and craft products.

A quarry to the east of the town is one of two major sources of spongolite, also called "Mount Barker Stone". While spongolite is commercially exploited for its absorbent qualities, it is also cut into bricks to use as a building material. Examples of white Mount Barker Stone are the Plantagenet Players Theatre, Marmion Street, Mount Barker and Hillside House, Albany. An example of the red variety is the Aquinas College Chapel in Salter Point, Perth.

In 2011, a wind farm was installed 4 kilometres (2.5 mi) north of Mount Barker, comprising three 73-metre-high (240 ft) 800 kW wind turbines, providing power to the town and surrounding area.

=== Wine region ===
Mount Barker is one of the five nominated subregions of the Great Southern wine region in Western Australia, which is Australia's largest wine region, with a rectangle 200 kilometres from east to west and over 100 kilometres from north to south. The area has been described as "the birthplace of the Great Southern wine region" and has won numerous awards for a variety of wines. Situated as it is in the middle of the Great Southern, the continental aspects of the climate make this ideal country for Riesling and Shiraz. While, as with the rest of the region, rainfall is winter-spring dominant, late vintage rains can create problems. Mount Barker's continentality also means greater diurnal temperature fluctuations and the occasional spring frost. The Plantagenet Plateau, with Mount Barker its centre point, is marked by its marri soils, lateritic gravelly/sandy loams coming directly from granite rock protrusions. Plantagenet Wines, established in 1968, was one of the first wineries in the region and is located within the town boundary.

== Features ==
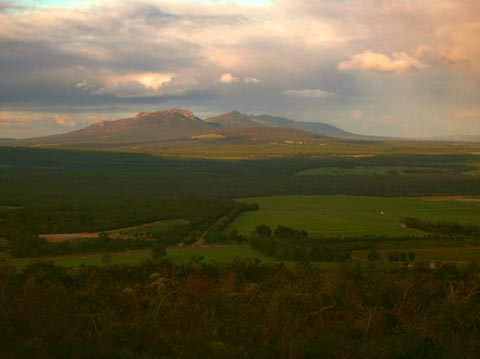
View east from Mount Barker Hill

The peak of Mount Barker lies 3.5 kilometres (2.2 mi) southwest of the town centre, and reaches an elevation of 404 metres (1,325 ft) above sea level. A sealed road leads to the base of a radio and television tower on the summit of the hill. The tower was constructed to a height of 168 metres (551 ft) in 1966, and extended to 193 metres (633 ft) in 2001. Views extend north to the Stirling Range and east to the Porongurup Range. An elevated concrete lookout provides views south to Albany and southwest toward Denmark. On clear days the Albany Wind Farm is visible 45 kilometres (28 mi) away to the south. In summer months the hill lookout is used to monitor risk posed by any nearby bushfires.

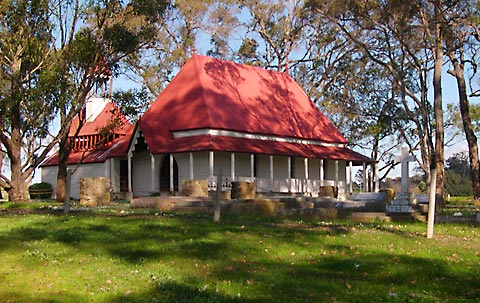
St Werburghs Church, Mount Barker

Mount Barker is also home to numerous historical buildings:

- St Werburghs Chapel was built in 1872 with walls made from chopped straw, clay and woodwork formed from local jarrah. A small cemetery doubles as a historical reference for the region. It is currently maintained only by local volunteers, and funded by donations. The chapel is a tourist drawcard and still operates regular services once a month, along with special Christmas "Carols By Candlelight" events.
- The old police station, opened in 1868, is now a museum.
- The Mount Barker Post Office and Telegraph Station, built in 1892, ceased operation in the 1960s. Today it is named "Mitchell House" and houses the local art society and gallery.
- Plantagenet Hotel was built between 1912 and 1914. The verandah includes apple motifs, in celebration of the flourishing apple industry. The hotel is still open for business.
- The town railway building, built in 1923, was restored in 1997 and today houses the Mount Barker Visitor Centre, offering local tourism information.

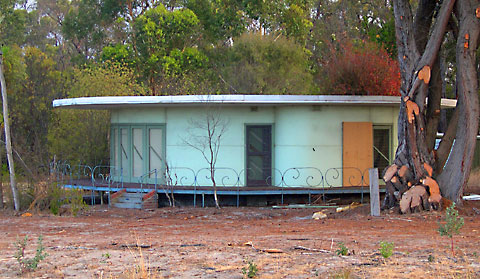
"The Round House" in disrepair, February 2007

- Sometime from the late 1950s to the early 1960s, Dutch immigrant and engineer Hubertus Johannes Van der Kolk built a circular house at the northern end of Mount Barker, beside Albany Highway. This unique structure, which could be rotated through 180 degrees to exploit seasonal changes, was labelled "The Round House". Though the home has fallen into disrepair, it was heritage listed in 2005 and Heritage Minister Fran Logan said: "It was an energy-efficient concept ahead of its time." The home was hidden from passers-by for many years by trees and shrubs but clearing for major roadworks, which commenced in December 2006, resulted in it once again being exposed to public view. Restoration works have been completed on "The Round House", however, engineers have stated that the damage is too extensive to the turning mechanism and the building will not be able to turn. The Heritage Council has published a detailed history of this "rare" building in a Register of Heritage Places - Assessment Document.
- The farming areas surrounding the town are also rich with old farmhouses, sheds and machinery.

The Stirling Range lies approximately 40 km to the northeast of the town by road, via Kendenup. The Porongurup Range is a 15-minute drive to the east of the town. The two ranges have vastly different appearances and display different flora and geology. Both parks have gazetted walk trails that are especially popular during the spring wildflower season, from August to November. The Porongurup Range has a "Granite Skywalk" access from the Castle Rock walk trail. The upper skywalk encompasses nearly 360-degree views, whilst the lower skywalk gives visitors views across the valley to the Stirling Range.

== Schools ==
Mount Barker Community College is an independent school that include both primary and secondary schools on the same campus. The college is located off Albany Highway on Woogenellup Road.

Mount Barker Community College opened in 2015; however, the college was previously known as Mount Barker Senior High School when it was still a state school.

== Media ==
Mount Barker radio stations include 783 Triple M (formerly 6VA and RadioWest), Vision FM, HitFM (formerly Hot FM), ABC South Coast, ABC NewsRadio, ABC Radio National, ABC Classic & Triple J.

Radio service frequencies
Service	Broadcast frequency
ABC Local Radio	630 kHz AM
783 Triple M	783 kHz AM
ABC News	92.1 MHz FM
Triple J	92.9 MHz FM
Vision Christian Radio	93.7 MHz FM
ABC Classic	94.5 MHz FM
HitFM	95.3 MHz FM
ABC Radio National	96.9 MHz FM

Localised television stations available in Mount Barker include Seven Network, WIN Television Western Australia, West Digital Television, SBS and ABC Television Western Australia. Seven (formerly GWN7) broadcasts a half-hour news program for regional WA, Seven News Regional WA (formerly GWN7 News), at 5:30pm on weeknights with a district newsroom covering Albany, Mount Barker and surrounding areas, based in Albany.

Services are broadcast from the Southern Agricultural site at Mount Barker Hill and cover the majority of the geographic area, with some residents relying on receiving these services via satellite using the Viewer Access Satellite Television system. The transmission site employs vertical polarisation.

Television service frequencies
LCN	Channel name	Broadcast ch. no.	Broadcast frequency
2	ABC TV	VHF 11	219.5 MHz
3	SBS	VHF 10	212.5 MHz
5	10 HD	VHF 12	226.5 MHz
6	7HD Regional WA	VHF 6	177.5 MHz
8	9HD	VHF 8	191.5 MHz
20	ABC HD	VHF 11	219.5 MHz
21	ABC TV	VHF 11	219.5 MHz
22	ABC Family/Kids	VHF 11	219.5 MHz
23	ABC Entertains	VHF 11	219.5 MHz
24	ABC News	VHF 11	219.5 MHz
30	SBS HD	VHF 10	212.5 MHz
31	SBS2	VHF 10	212.5 MHz
32	SBS World Movies	VHF 10	212.5 MHz
33	SBS Food	VHF 10	212.5 MHz
34	NITV HD	VHF 10	212.5 MHz
35	SBS WorldWatch	VHF 10	212.5 MHz
36	NITV	VHF 10	212.5 MHz
50	10 Drama	VHF 12	226.5 MHz
55	10 Comedy	VHF 12	226.5 MHz
62	7two Regional WA	VHF 6	177.5 MHz
64	7mateHD Regional WA	VHF 6	177.5 MHz
67	TVSN	VHF 6	177.5 MHz
68	Racing.com	VHF 6	177.5 MHz
80	9HD	VHF 8	191.5 MHz
81	9Gem	VHF 8	191.5 MHz
82	9Go!	VHF 8	191.5 MHz
85	9Life	VHF 8	191.5 MHz

== Facilities ==
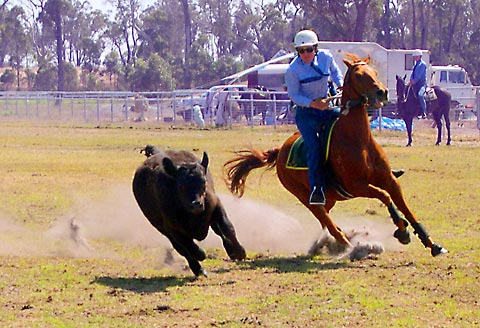
Campdrafting, Mount Barker, WA

Mount Barker has a hospital and medical centre, police station, TAFE college, a community college catering for K–12 schooling, childcare facilities plus Scouts and Girl Guides. New shire offices were opened in the town centre in 2006.

In 2004, the state government announced preliminary funding for construction of the Mount Barker Community College. This "One Community, One College" project will ultimately see all public schooling, from kindergarten to TAFE, located on the existing Mount Barker Senior High School site. Work commenced on the integrated facility in January 2007 with the aim of catering for years 4 to 12 by 2008. In December 2007, funding for Stage Two, for Kindergarten to year 3, was confirmed. Construction of all stages is now complete, as is the new Trade Training Centre.

Mount Barker has commercial, retail and industrial facilities associated with the regional centre for the Plantagenet Shire. Sporting facilities include a football ground (Sounness Park), the home of the Mount Barker Football Club, a modern indoor recreation centre and gymnasium, a 50m outdoor swimming pool, speedway track, horse-racing track (Frost Park) and skate park. Popular sports include Australian rules football, rugby union, cricket and equestrian pursuits.

Besides the public library, Mount Barker also has cultural facilities including a public art gallery that displays and offers works by local artists. There is also a popular amateur theatre company, "The Plantagenet Players", which has members from nine years old to seniors.

Emergency services in the town consist of police and volunteers in the St John Ambulance, Fire and Rescue Service, Bush Fire Service and State Emergency Service. Training and equipment are provided by both the Shire and state government. There are a number of charitable organisations including Rotary, Lions, Red Cross, and Anglicare.

The Great Southern Railway, which runs through town, commenced operation to Mount Barker in 1889, boosting expansion in the region. There are no longer passenger services on the line, which is used primarily for grain haulage to the Port of Albany. The train passes a few times per day and has a distinct noise that can be heard throughout the town, including a loud fog horn.

Pardelup Prison is located near Denbarker, just west of Mount Barker.

Residents of Mount Barker, Western Australia comment that the town is often confused with Mount Barker, South Australia, especially when dealing with national telephone centres based outside Western Australia.

== Climate ==
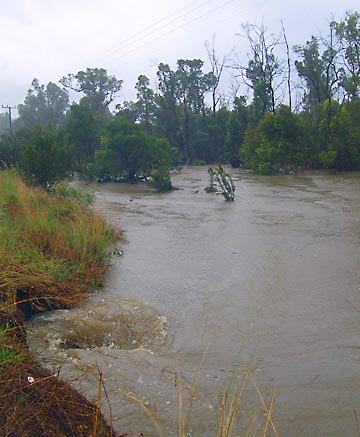
Sleeman Creek culvert in full flood, 1 April 2005

Mount Barker has a temperate climate with warm summers and mild to cold winters. Summer temperatures can exceed 40 degrees Celsius, but rarely do, averaging around 26 degrees. Overnight temperatures in winter can drop to 0 degrees, but rarely any lower and daytime winter temperatures average around 10-15 degrees Celsius.

Rainfall averages from around 24 millimetres (1 in) per month in January to over 100 millimetres (4 in) in July.

Climate data for Mount Barker (normals 1991-2020, extremes 1886–present)
Month	Jan	Feb	Mar	Apr	May	Jun	Jul	Aug	Sep	Oct	Nov	Dec	Year
Record high °C (°F)	43.9 (111.0)	43.6 (110.5)	40.6 (105.1)	37.2 (99.0)	32.2 (90.0)	24.3 (75.7)	22.2 (72.0)	25.0 (77.0)	29.3 (84.7)	35.6 (96.1)	39.4 (102.9)	42.9 (109.2)	43.9 (111.0)
Mean maximum °C (°F)	37.9 (100.2)	37.2 (99.0)	35.8 (96.4)	30.5 (86.9)	25.1 (77.2)	20.3 (68.5)	18.7 (65.7)	20.6 (69.1)	23.0 (73.4)	28.6 (83.5)	33.3 (91.9)	35.0 (95.0)	39.6 (103.3)
Mean daily maximum °C (°F)	26.6 (79.9)	26.7 (80.1)	24.8 (76.6)	22.1 (71.8)	18.5 (65.3)	15.7 (60.3)	14.8 (58.6)	15.4 (59.7)	16.9 (62.4)	19.5 (67.1)	22.4 (72.3)	24.2 (75.6)	20.6 (69.1)
Daily mean °C (°F)	19.9 (67.8)	20.2 (68.4)	19.0 (66.2)	16.8 (62.2)	14.0 (57.2)	11.7 (53.1)	10.8 (51.4)	11.2 (52.2)	12.2 (54.0)	14.1 (57.4)	16.3 (61.3)	17.9 (64.2)	15.3 (59.6)
Mean daily minimum °C (°F)	13.1 (55.6)	13.7 (56.7)	13.0 (55.4)	11.5 (52.7)	9.5 (49.1)	7.7 (45.9)	6.8 (44.2)	6.9 (44.4)	7.4 (45.3)	8.7 (47.7)	10.2 (50.4)	11.5 (52.7)	10.0 (50.0)
Mean minimum °C (°F)	9.4 (48.9)	9.5 (49.1)	8.6 (47.5)	7.0 (44.6)	5.3 (41.5)	4.3 (39.7)	3.2 (37.8)	3.2 (37.8)	3.4 (38.1)	4.4 (39.9)	5.7 (42.3)	7.4 (45.3)	2.6 (36.7)
Record low °C (°F)	1.7 (35.1)	4.0 (39.2)	3.6 (38.5)	2.2 (36.0)	0.6 (33.1)	−1.1 (30.0)	−2.2 (28.0)	−1.3 (29.7)	−0.6 (30.9)	0.1 (32.2)	1.1 (34.0)	1.1 (34.0)	−2.2 (28.0)
Average precipitation mm (inches)	21.2 (0.83)	23.3 (0.92)	41.2 (1.62)	47.5 (1.87)	65.4 (2.57)	75.0 (2.95)	85.8 (3.38)	86.9 (3.42)	75.8 (2.98)	51.4 (2.02)	41.2 (1.62)	31.6 (1.24)	646.3 (25.42)
Average precipitation days	8.4	8.2	11.5	13.4	15.9	19.1	21.2	21.5	19.4	15.7	12.7	9.2	176.2
Average dew point °C (°F)	12.0 (53.6)	12.3 (54.1)	11.8 (53.2)	10.9 (51.6)	9.6 (49.3)	8.5 (47.3)	8.3 (46.9)	8.1 (46.6)	8.9 (48.0)	9.7 (49.5)	10.4 (50.7)	11.2 (52.2)	10.1 (50.3)
Source: Bureau of Meteorology

=== Significant weather events ===
- While light snowfalls are not unusual on the peaks of the Porongurup and Stirling Range, it is very unusual for snow to fall to ground level anywhere in Western Australia. However, snow has been recorded in Mount Barker on several occasions. On 28 August 1992, with a maximum temperature of 7.2 degrees Celsius, two falls of snow were recorded. That same year, on 19 November, a light snowfall was recorded just two weeks before summer, this was the latest in the year snow had been recorded in the whole of Western Australia.
- In June 2000, the Town Hall in Mount Barker lost its roof as a result of strong wind gusts.
- On 28 December 2000, unusually hot weather and 44 km/h winds contributed to a bushfire that travelled south through the town, destroying two houses plus other buildings and equipment.
- On 1 April 2005, the Plantagenet Shire suffered substantial flooding after heavy and persistent rainfall in the previous two days.
- Golf ball-sized hail fell in Mount Barker and surrounding districts on 23 October 2006.
