= Rocky Gully, Western Australia =

Rocky Gully
- Town
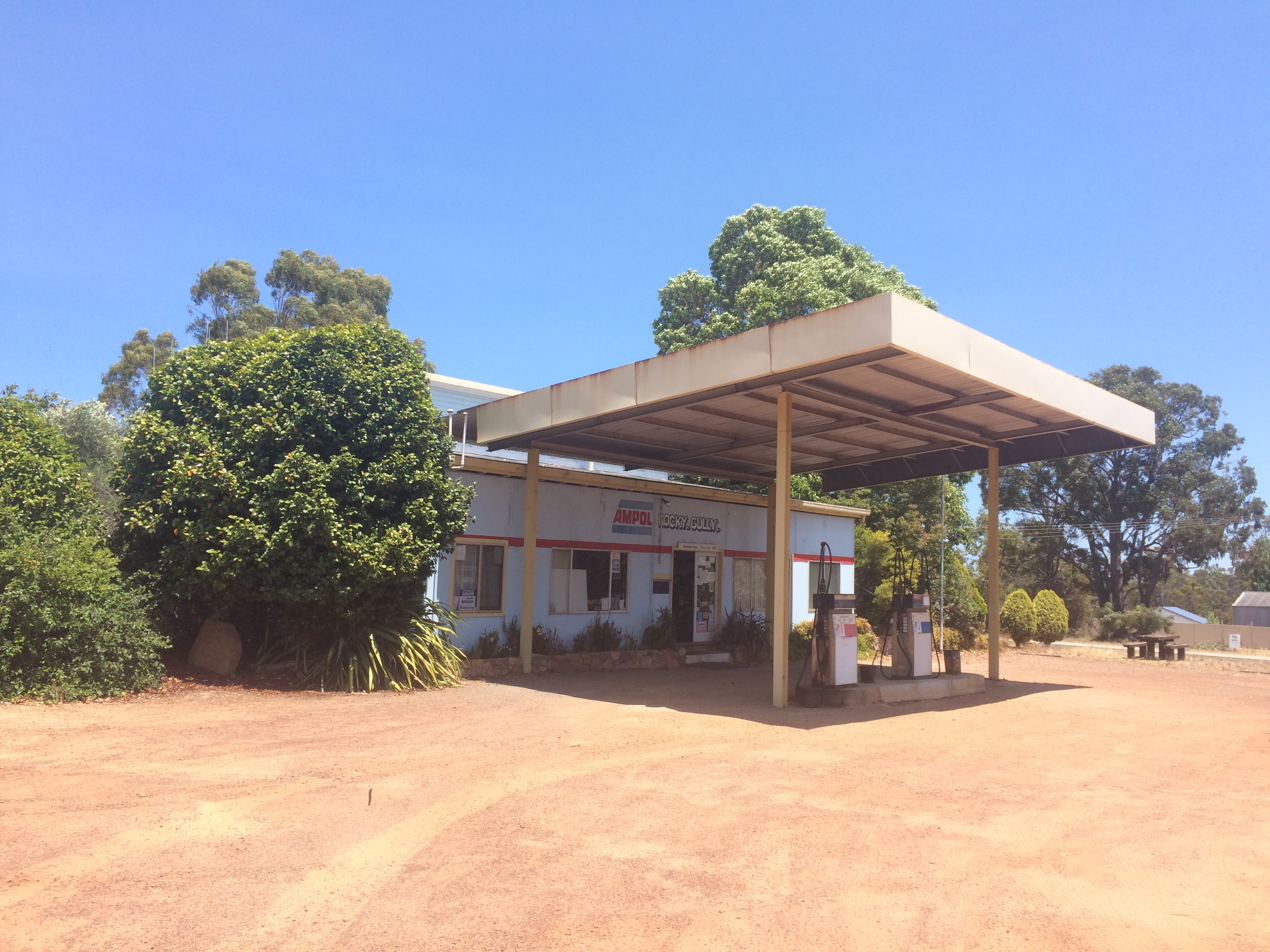
- Rocky Gully General Store

- Interactive map of Rocky Gully
- Coordinates: 34°30′34″S 117°00′42″E
- Country: Australia
- State: Western Australia
- LGA: Shire of Plantagenet
- Location: 385 km (239 mi) south of Perth; 55 km (34 mi) southwest of Cranbrook; 62 km (39 mi) west of Mount Barker
- Established: 1951

Government
  - State electorate: Warren-Blackwood
  - Federal division: O'Connor

Area
  - Total: 883.3 km^{2} (341.0 sq mi)
- Elevation: 286 m (938 ft)

Population
  - Total: 92 (SAL 2021)
- Postcode: 6397
- Mean max temp: 21.0 °C (69.8 °F)
- Mean min temp: 9.7 °C (49.5 °F)
- Annual rainfall: 712.1 mm (28.04 in)
Localities around Rocky Gully
Frankland River	Frankland River	Perillup
Lake Muir	Rocky Gully	Perillup
North Walpole	Trent	Mount Romance

Rocky Gully is a small town and locality of the Shire of Plantagenet in the Great Southern region of Western Australia. A large part of the south of the locality is covered by the Mount Roe National Park. Additionally, the Tootanellup Nature Reserve is also located within Rocky Gully.

The town is located along the Muir Highway, about 8 kilometres (5 mi) from the Kent River.

== History ==
A site was selected for a town when land in the area was sub-divided in the 1930s. By 1951 a small community was established as part of the War Service land settlement scheme and the townsite was gazetted.

== Geography ==
=== Climate ===
Rocky Gully has a warm-summer mediterranean climate (Köppen: Csb); with warm, dry summers and mild, moderately wet winters. Extreme temperatures ranged from 43.3 °C (109.9 °F) on 1 February 2024 to −0.4 °C (31.3 °F) on 13 July 2016 and 24 August 2016. The wettest recorded day was 2 April 2005 with 84.2 mm (3.31 in) of rainfall.

Climate data for Rocky Gully (34.57°S 117.01°E) (250 m (820 ft) AMSL) (1963-2025)
Month	Jan	Feb	Mar	Apr	May	Jun	Jul	Aug	Sep	Oct	Nov	Dec	Year
Record high °C (°F)	43.1 (109.6)	43.3 (109.9)	40.7 (105.3)	35.0 (95.0)	29.3 (84.7)	22.7 (72.9)	21.5 (70.7)	24.6 (76.3)	27.4 (81.3)	34.0 (93.2)	38.1 (100.6)	41.8 (107.2)	43.3 (109.9)
Mean maximum °C (°F)	38.6 (101.5)	37.9 (100.2)	35.8 (96.4)	30.3 (86.5)	25.1 (77.2)	20.2 (68.4)	18.7 (65.7)	20.6 (69.1)	23.5 (74.3)	28.7 (83.7)	33.7 (92.7)	37.0 (98.6)	40.4 (104.7)
Mean daily maximum °C (°F)	27.6 (81.7)	27.5 (81.5)	25.2 (77.4)	21.9 (71.4)	18.6 (65.5)	15.7 (60.3)	14.7 (58.5)	15.5 (59.9)	16.8 (62.2)	19.4 (66.9)	22.9 (73.2)	25.7 (78.3)	21.0 (69.7)
Daily mean °C (°F)	20.2 (68.4)	20.4 (68.7)	19.0 (66.2)	16.4 (61.5)	13.9 (57.0)	11.7 (53.1)	10.7 (51.3)	11.2 (52.2)	12.0 (53.6)	13.8 (56.8)	16.4 (61.5)	18.4 (65.1)	15.3 (59.6)
Mean daily minimum °C (°F)	12.7 (54.9)	13.3 (55.9)	12.7 (54.9)	10.9 (51.6)	9.2 (48.6)	7.7 (45.9)	6.6 (43.9)	6.9 (44.4)	7.2 (45.0)	8.2 (46.8)	9.8 (49.6)	11.1 (52.0)	9.7 (49.5)
Mean minimum °C (°F)	6.8 (44.2)	7.5 (45.5)	6.7 (44.1)	5.0 (41.0)	4.1 (39.4)	3.2 (37.8)	1.8 (35.2)	2.3 (36.1)	2.2 (36.0)	2.9 (37.2)	4.5 (40.1)	5.4 (41.7)	1.1 (34.0)
Record low °C (°F)	3.2 (37.8)	5.3 (41.5)	4.2 (39.6)	2.7 (36.9)	1.2 (34.2)	0.3 (32.5)	−0.4 (31.3)	−0.4 (31.3)	0.1 (32.2)	0.9 (33.6)	0.5 (32.9)	3.0 (37.4)	−0.4 (31.3)
Average precipitation mm (inches)	18.5 (0.73)	18.4 (0.72)	36.0 (1.42)	54.0 (2.13)	75.8 (2.98)	93.8 (3.69)	111.5 (4.39)	97.8 (3.85)	91.4 (3.60)	55.5 (2.19)	41.6 (1.64)	25.4 (1.00)	712.1 (28.04)
Average precipitation days (≥ 0.2 mm)	7.2	6.8	10.4	13.6	17.2	19.7	21.5	20.2	20.0	16.1	12.0	7.8	172.5
Average afternoon relative humidity (%)	44	44	48	54	61	70	71	69	68	63	53	46	58
Average dew point °C (°F)	10.6 (51.1)	10.9 (51.6)	10.1 (50.2)	9.9 (49.8)	8.8 (47.8)	8.5 (47.3)	7.8 (46.0)	7.9 (46.2)	8.3 (46.9)	9.1 (48.4)	9.7 (49.5)	9.7 (49.5)	9.3 (48.7)
Source: Bureau of Meteorology (1996-2025)

=== Nature reserve ===
The Tootanellup Nature Reserve was gazetted on 24 November 1944, has a size of 9.44 square kilometres (3.64 mi^{2}), and is located within the Jarrah Forest bioregion.
