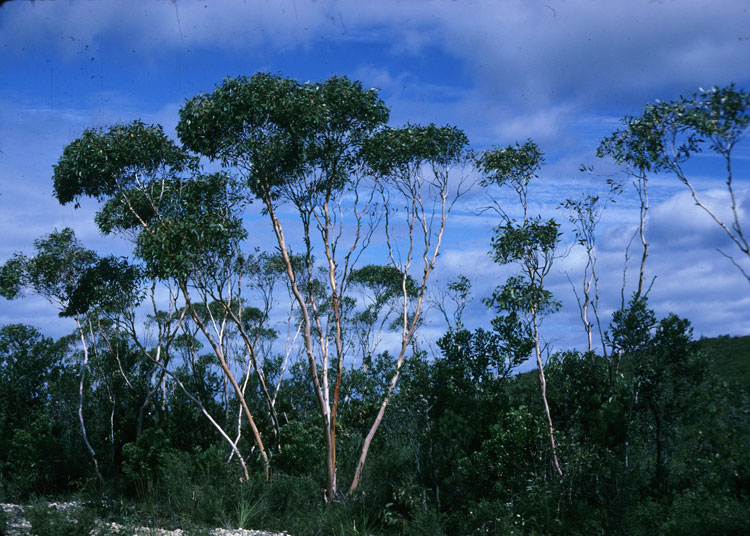

Conservation status
- Near Threatened (IUCN 3.1)

Scientific classification
- Kingdom: Plantae
- Clade: Tracheophytes
- Clade: Angiosperms
- Clade: Eudicots
- Clade: Rosids
- Order: Myrtales
- Family: Myrtaceae
- Genus: Eucalyptus
- Species: E. decurva

Binomial name
- Eucalyptus decurva F.Muell.

= Eucalyptus decurva =

Slender mallee

Species of eucalyptus

Eucalyptus decurva, commonly known as the slender mallee, is a species of mallee that is endemic to the south-west of Western Australia. It has smooth whitish bark, lance-shaped to curved adult leaves, pendulous flower buds arranged in groups of seven, white flowers and pendulous, more or less spherical fruit.

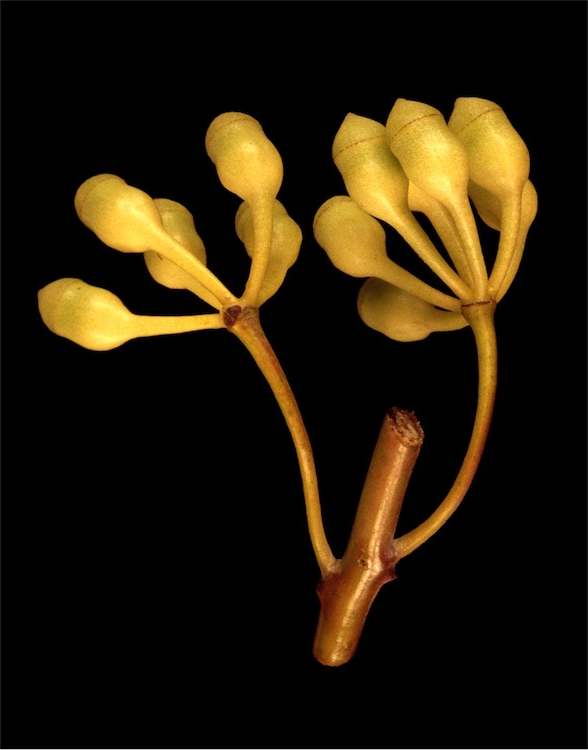
Flower buds

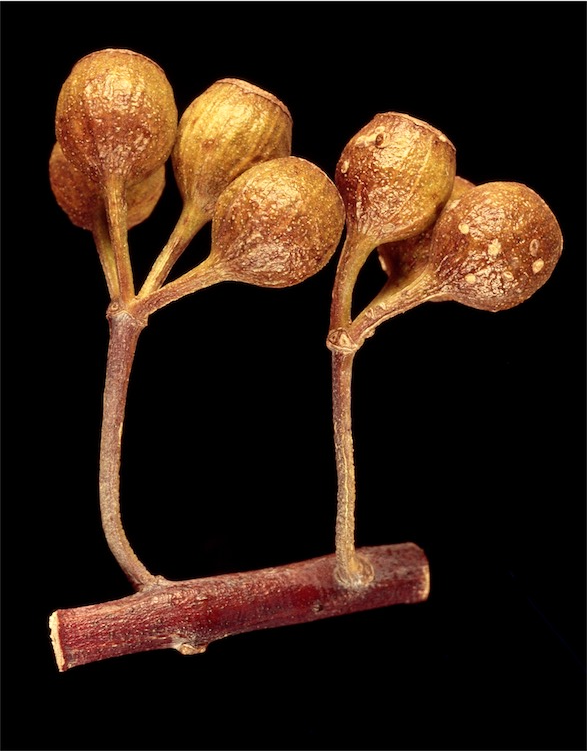
Fruit

== Description ==
Eucalyptus decurva is a mallee that typically grows to a height of 1.5–5 m (4 ft 11 in – 16 ft 5 in) and forms a lignotuber. The bark is smooth, white-gray, salmon to yellow-green and sometimes powdery. Young plants and coppice regrowth have dull greyish green leaves arranged in opposite pairs, oblong to elliptic or egg-shaped, 35–105 mm (1.4–4.1 in) long and 30–70 mm (1.2–2.8 in) wide. Adult leaves are arranged alternately, glossy green, lance-shaped to curved, 50–105 mm (2.0–4.1 in) long and 12–25 mm (0.47–0.98 in) wide on a petiole 10–20 mm (0.39–0.79 in) long. The flower buds are pendulous and arranged in leaf axils in groups of seven on a peduncle 10–25 mm (0.39–0.98 in) long, the individual buds on a pedicel 4–10 mm (0.16–0.39 in) long. Mature buds are more or less cylindrical to pear-shaped, 5–10 mm (0.20–0.39 in) long and 4–5 mm (0.16–0.20 in) wide. Flowering occurs between April and October and the flowers are white to pale pink. The fruit is a pendulous, woody, more or less spherical capsule 7–11 mm (0.28–0.43 in) long and 7–10 mm (0.28–0.39 in) wide on a pedicel 3–12 mm (0.12–0.47 in) long.

== Taxonomy and naming ==
Eucalyptus decurva was first formally described in 1863 by Ferdinand von Mueller from a specimen collected by George Maxwell near the Porongurups and the description was published in Fragmenta phytographiae Australiae. The specific epithet (decurva) is a Latin word meaning "down-curved", referring to the flower buds.

== Distribution and habitat ==
Slender mallee grows in sandy and lateritic soils in hilly coastal and near-coastal areas, mostly between the Stirling Range and Esperance but with disjunct populations near Perth.

== See also ==
- List of Eucalyptus species
