= Xanthoparmelia toolbrunupensis =

Scientific classification
- Kingdom: Fungi
- Division: Ascomycota
- Class: Lecanoromycetes
- Order: Lecanorales
- Family: Parmeliaceae
- Genus: Xanthoparmelia
- Species: X. toolbrunupensis

Binomial name
- Xanthoparmelia toolbrunupensis Elix (2003)
- Holotype: Stirling Range National Park, Western Australia

Species of foliose lichen

Xanthoparmelia toolbrunupensis is a species of foliose lichen in the family Parmeliaceae, first described scientifically by the lichenologist John Elix in 2003. This species is endemic to Western Australia, with a distribution limited to the Stirling Range.

== Taxonomy ==
Xanthoparmelia toolbrunupensis was formally described as a new species in 2003 by the Australian lichenologist John Elix. The type specimen in Western Australia along the trail to Toolbrunup peak within the Stirling Range National Park. This location lies approximately 40 kilometres southwest of Borden, at an elevation of 740 metres above sea level. The specimen was discovered on volcanic rocks in a dry sclerophyll forest, characterised by pockets of denser shrub vegetation. The collection, made by Elix on 17 September 1994, bears the collection number 41492. The holotype is preserved at the Australian National Herbarium (CANB).

== Description ==
The thallus of Xanthoparmelia toolbrunupensis is small-foliose to somewhat crustose and very tightly attached to the substrate, spanning up to 5 cm (2 in) in width. Its lobes are narrow, ranging from 0.3 to 0.8 mm wide, and have sublinear to elongate forms with subdichotomous to dichotomous branching. The tips of the lobes are incised.

The upper surface of the thallus is pale yellow-green, becoming darker and duller with age, featuring a smooth or weakly rugulose (wrinkled) texture that develops transverse cracks over time. This leads to areolate formations in the thallus centre. The thallus lacks soredia and isidia, common reproductive propagules in many lichens.

The lower surface is jet-black and smooth, with sparse, short, simple, rudimentary black rhizines. No reproductive structures like apothecia (fruiting bodies) or pycnidia (asexual spore-producing structures) have been observed to occur in this species.

Chemically, Xanthoparmelia toolbrunupensis shows a medulla reaction of K+ (yellow), indicating the presence of usnic acid, hypoconstictic acid, and constictic acid as major secondary metabolites (lichen products). This chemical makeup contributes to its distinctive classification among related species.

== Habitat and distribution ==
Xanthoparmelia toolbrunupensis is specifically found on volcanic rocks atop small mesas within dry sclerophyll forests and shrublands in the Stirling Range of Western Australia. At the time of its original publication, it was known to occur only in its type locality.

== See also ==
- List of Xanthoparmelia species
