= Takalarup, Western Australia =

Locality in Western Australia

Takalarup
- Interactive map of Takalarup
- Coordinates: 34°36′S 118°2′E
- Country: Australia
- State: Western Australia
- LGA: Shire of Plantagenet
- Location: 406 km (252 mi) SE of Perth; 66 km (41 mi) NNE of Albany; 50 km (31 mi) E of Mount Barker

Government
  - State electorate: Warren-Blackwood
  - Federal division: O'Connor

Area
  - Total: 441.1 km^{2} (170.3 sq mi)

Population
  - Total: 127 (SAL 2021)
- Time zone: UTC+8 (AWST)
- Postcode: 6324
Localities around Takalarup
Stirling Range NP	Stirling Range NP	Stirling Range NP
Woogenellup	Takalarup	South Stirling
Porongurup	Napier	Palmdale

Takalarup is a locality of the Shire of Plantagenet in the Great Southern region of Western Australia. The Stirling Range National Park forms its northern border and the Kalgan River runs through the south-west of the locality. The Chillinup Nature Reserve is located within Takalarup, as is a small section of the South Stirling Nature Reserve.

It lies to the East of the Porongurup Range and South of the Stirling Range, being 50 kilometres (31 mi) east of the town of Mount Barker, and 66 kilometres (41 mi) north-northeast of Albany. At the 2021 census, it had a population of 127.

== Nature reserve ==
The Chillinup Nature Reserve is fully located within Takalarup and was gazetted on 31 July 1959, has a size of 3.3 square kilometres (1.3 sq mi), and is located within the Esperance Plains bioregion.
