= Gibraltar Rock (Western Australia) =

Granite outcrop in Western Australia

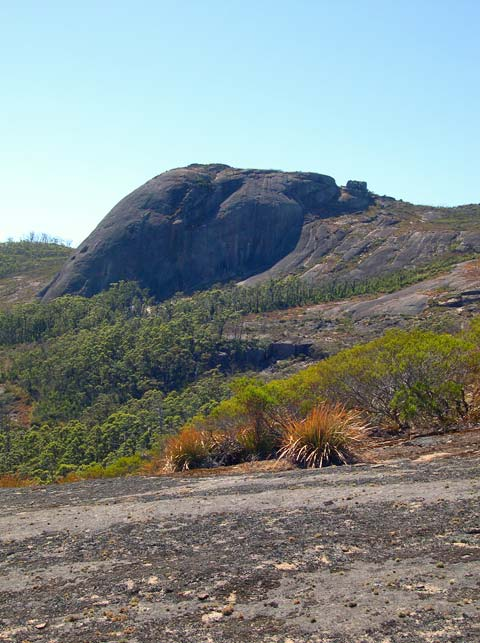
- Gibraltar Rock, Porongurups

Highest point
- Elevation: 2,100 ft (640 m)
- Coordinates: 34°40′13″S 117°51′19″E

Geography
- Parent range: Porongurups Range

Gibraltar Rock is a granite outcrop in the Porongurup National Park, south of Perth, in Western Australia. From the rock, which is 640 metres (2,100 feet) high, Albany and the Great Southern Ocean can be seen. Since the 1970s, the Rock, along with some other local peaks, has become a popular venue for rock climbers.

== Location ==
Gibraltar Rock is 355 kilometres (221 mi) south of Perth, Western Australia. The rock is located in the Porongorups Range, which has thirteen total named peaks including Twin Peaks, The Devils Slide, Nancy Peak, Castle Rock, and Elephant Rock. From the peak of the rock, Albany and the Great Southern Ocean can be seen. Road access to the rock is from Bolganup Road and Scenic Drive.

== Features ==
Gibraltar Rock is 640 metres (2,100 ft) tall, and is part of a range that sits at 660 metres (2,170 ft) high. The rock is made of rough granite. Its appearance has been compared to the Rock of Gibraltar.

In the early 1990s, the Rock was yielding small amounts of gold to the "dollying" process. It shares characteristics with other terrain in the area which was successfully mined in the late 1800s. The lack of water in the area made more successful mining of the rock difficult in the early part of the twentieth century. As of 1962, the average annual rainfall in the area was roughly 810 millimetres (32 in) per year.

Gibraltar Rock has been described as "an enormous hunk of rough granite that provides the longest and most serious slab climbing in WA". The first organised climb by the Climbers Association of Western Australia was done in 1974. One of the faces of the rock is called Dockyard Wall. It was originally graded 17 crux climb. Two climbing bolts were added to this route in 1992. Other routes up the mountain include Second Anniversary Waltz, Crime of Passion, Dinosaur, Apes Den, Illusions of Grandeur, Possum, Apesway, Main Street, Sucked in Ben, Moorish Steps, Europa Point, Rooster Carnage, Joint Venture, and Zeppelin.

== Background ==
In 1928, an exhibition of the watercolour works of C. S. Bardwell Clarke was held at the artist's studio, Sheffield House, Perth. The exhibition included a work featuring Gibraltar Rock. A winery is named after the rock.

== See also ==
- Granite outcrops of Western Australia
