= Bluff Knoll =

Mountain in Western Australia

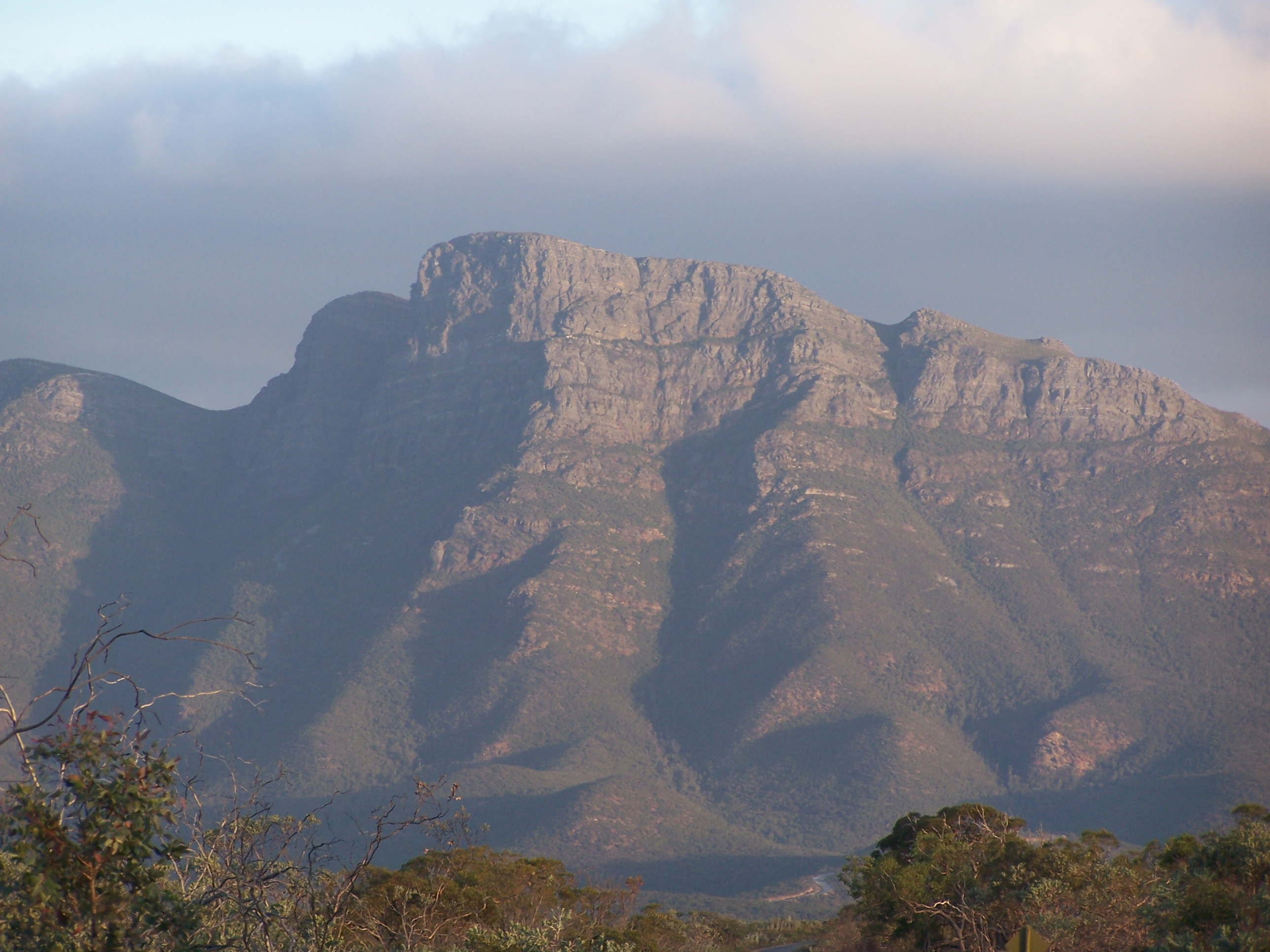

Highest point
- Elevation: 1,099 m (3,606 ft)
- Prominence: 650 m (2,130 ft)
- Coordinates: 34°22′32″S 118°15′22″E

Geography
- Location within Western Australia
- Location: Great Southern of Western Australia
- Parent range: Stirling Range

Bluff Knoll is the highest peak of the Stirling Range in the Great Southern region of Western Australia (WA). It is 1,099 metres (3,606 ft) above sea level, with a prominence of 650 metres (2,130 ft). The local Aboriginal people, the Mineng and Koreng/Goreng sub-groups of the Noongar Nation, call the mountain Boola Miyel or Pualaar Miial, meaning 'great many-faced hill' or 'many eyes', as the peak has rock formations that resemble eyes looking out across the valley.

The main access to the base of the walk trail is from Chester Pass Road. The Bluff Knoll trail is a round trip of about 6 kilometres (4 mi) taking three to four hours, and has a grade 4 rating of climbing difficulty, with some steep and rough steps. In 2020 many parts of the trail were destroyed in the Black Summer bushfires, and has since been upgraded and improved. The view from the summit encompasses the Stirling and Porongurup mountain ranges, as well as the coast near Albany.

Due to its elevation, Bluff Knoll and the surrounding peaks of the Stirling Ranges are some of only a few places to experience regular snowfalls in Western Australia. When snow is forecast by the Bureau of Meteorology it attracts hikers from all over the southwest region to experience it.

The peak was given its name by Governor James Stirling as the highest point in the Stirling Range. Although Bluff Knoll is sometimes claimed to be the highest point in Western Australia, the highest peak is actually Mount Meharry in Karijini National Park in the Hamersley Range, which is 1,249 metres (4,098 ft) above sea level.

== Aboriginal history ==
Some Mineng and Koreng/Goreng people treat the bluff with foreboding and prefer to avoid its rocky ridges. Noongar artist Tjyllyungoo/Lance Chadd states:

It's a place of different moods, lots of eyes looking...In the old days, old people went around that place. It holds the totemic spirit of our people.

The mountain is often shrouded in a mist which curls around the peaks and floats into the gullies. Signage at the Bluff Knoll carpark states that a mist-like spirit named Noatch (meaning 'dead body' or 'corpse' in the Noongar language) resides there.

In Boola Miyel: The place of many faces Noongar Elders Jack Williams and Averil Dean state:

Boola Miyel is the place of many faces. If you look into the rock face you will see all of the eyes of the many faces looking out at you. Boola Miyel is the place where the spirit Noyintj lives, this is the spirit of the dead...When any Noongar person dies down in Koreng country, their spirit always comes back to Boola Miyel before it passes onto the great beyond.

Elders Williams and Dean also associate Bluff Knoll with the story of a young woman who set two suitors against each other, resulting in their deaths. The young woman was banished and became a lonely spirit who wails and wanders among the peaks.

== Geology ==
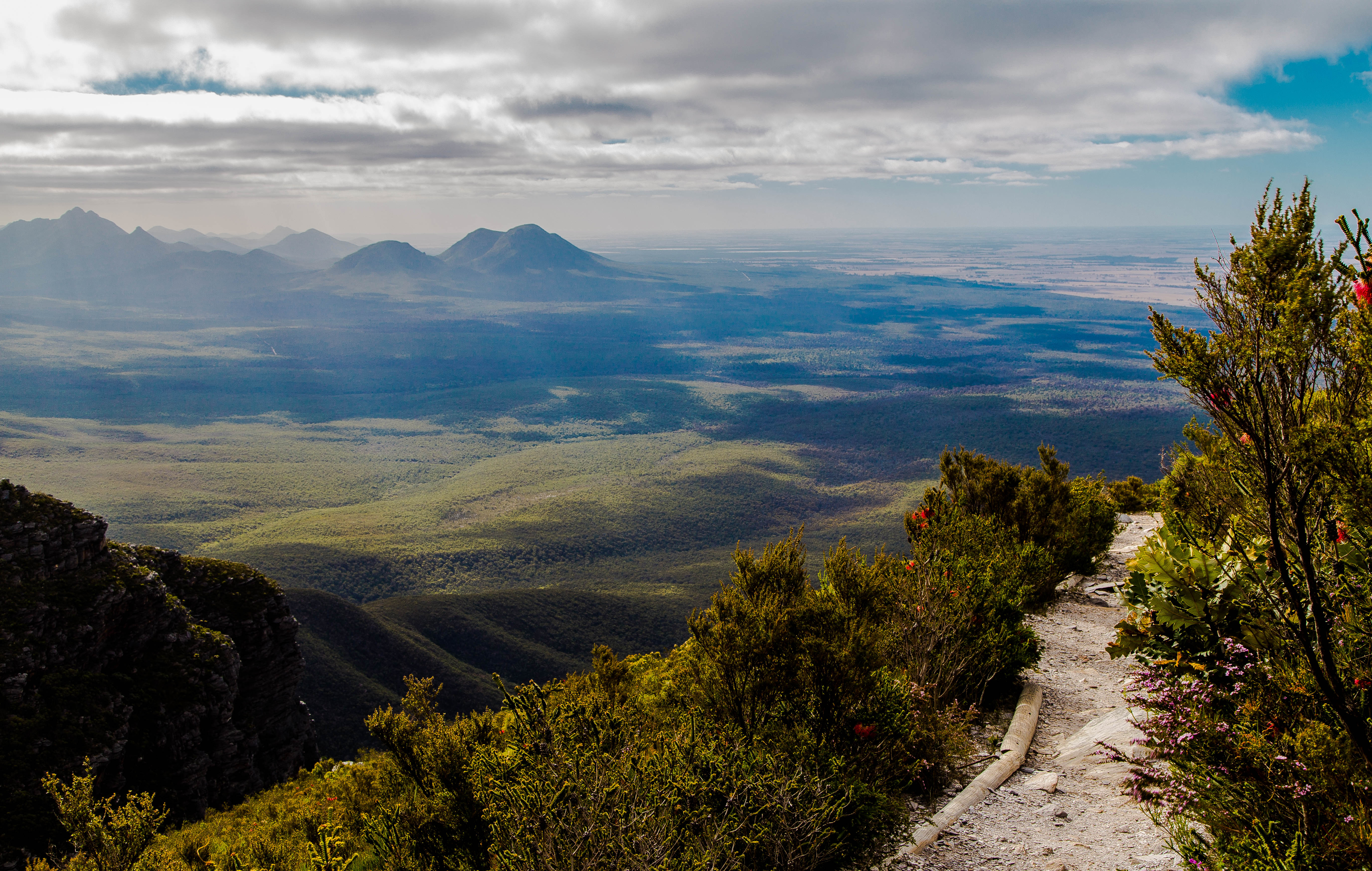
The path from Bluff Knoll summit

The mountain as well as the rest of the Stirling Range were formed as Australia broke away from Antarctica. When both the continents began to separate a rift gradually opened. In the first stage of rifting, it began to open in the west, then later the eastern section began to open. The two continents pivoted slightly at a point in the west, which squeezed the sediments at the western end of the break against the Yilgarn block, which forced the sediments up to form the range. The sedimentary rocks that were folded up are 1.2 billion years old. The rocks on the range are mostly sedimentary such as sandstone, quartzite, slate and shale.

== Climate ==
While there are no weather stations on Bluff Knoll, the Australian Bureau of Meteorology's gridded climate dataset extrapolates the highest average elevation, coldest 0.025° × 0.025° area of the Stirling Ranges (the 6.5 square kilometres (2.5 mi^{2}) from 34.35° to 34.375° S and 118.25° to 118.275° E; (Note: The resolution of the BoM's gridded climate data depends on the variable; temperature is sampled at 0.025°, rainfall at 0.05° (nearest pixel 34.325–34.375° S, 118.225–118.275° E) in the freely-downloadable data, rain days and relative humidity at 0.1° (nearest pixel 34.35–34.45° S, 118.25–118.35° E), sunshine hours at 0.25° (nearest pixel 34.145–34.375° S, 118.125–118.375° E), and UV index at 1.5° (nearest pixel 33.42–34.92° S, 117.75–119.25° E).) just excluding the summit but at a higher average elevation than its pixel) as having, averaged over its extent, a temperate or warm-summer mediterranean climate (Csb) according to the Köppen and Bureau of Meteorology classification systems. Alternatively, according to the Trewartha climate classification, it has a temperate oceanic climate (Do) due to insufficiently seasonal precipitation, bordering on Trewartha's humid subtropical climate (Cf) due to its eighth-warmest month (May) being only 0.5 °C (0.9 °F) cooler than 10 °C (50 °F) on average. Due to global warming since the 1961–1990 normals used in the temperature extrapolation, the area may now fall within that zone, but unlikely the summit itself.

Bluff Knoll is the coldest place in Western Australia. Summers are mild while winters are cold by Australian standards; area-wide winter means are comparable to those of Canberra, and average August lows at the summit likely brush freezing, with maxima frequently beating the 5.6 °C (42.1 °F) state record low figure set on 16 July 1946 at Salmon Gums and 5 August 1951 at Mount Barker. Diurnal temperature variation is significantly greater in summer than in winter, averaging 12.1 °C (21.8 °F) in January yet only 5.3 °C (9.5 °F) in July. Like most areas of southwestern Australia, more precipitation is recorded in winter, though precipitation events tend to be heavier in summer.

Bluff Knoll is one of only a few places to experience regular snowfalls in Western Australia, with some snow reported in most years. Snow on 20 April 1970 was recorded in Bureau of Meteorology (BOM) records. A heavy snowfall was recorded on 6 October 1992 when 20 centimetres of snow fell and light snow was seen at the base, at 450 metres (1,480 ft). Snow fell on three occasions in 2016 after only falling once in 2015. A flurry was recorded on the peak after 2:00 pm on 19 April 2019—it was the earliest recorded snow event in a calendar year in the history of Western Australia.

Climate data for Bluff Knoll area (extrapolated; temperatures and rainy days 1961–90, rainfall 1981–2010, humidity 1976–2005, UV index 1979–2007)
Month	Jan	Feb	Mar	Apr	May	Jun	Jul	Aug	Sep	Oct	Nov	Dec	Year
Mean daily maximum °C (°F)	22.3 (72.1)	21.7 (71.1)	19.7 (67.5)	16.2 (61.2)	12.7 (54.9)	10.1 (50.2)	9.2 (48.6)	9.7 (49.5)	11.9 (53.4)	14.5 (58.1)	17.2 (63.0)	20.6 (69.1)	15.5 (59.9)
Daily mean °C (°F)	16.2 (61.2)	16.2 (61.2)	14.8 (58.6)	12.3 (54.1)	9.5 (49.1)	7.4 (45.3)	6.6 (43.9)	6.7 (44.1)	8.1 (46.6)	10.0 (50.0)	12.2 (54.0)	14.6 (58.3)	11.2 (52.2)
Mean daily minimum °C (°F)	10.2 (50.4)	10.7 (51.3)	9.9 (49.8)	8.3 (46.9)	6.3 (43.3)	4.7 (40.5)	3.9 (39.0)	3.6 (38.5)	4.4 (39.9)	5.5 (41.9)	7.1 (44.8)	8.7 (47.7)	6.9 (44.5)
Average rainfall mm (inches)	24.1 (0.95)	19.6 (0.77)	32.2 (1.27)	38.4 (1.51)	60.1 (2.37)	62.7 (2.47)	69.4 (2.73)	65.3 (2.57)	58.0 (2.28)	41.6 (1.64)	39.0 (1.54)	25.9 (1.02)	536.3 (21.12)
Average rainy days (≥ 1 mm)	2	3	4	6	9	11	12	11	10	8	6	3	85
Average afternoon relative humidity (%) (at 15:00)	40	42	45	51	60	67	67	64	59	51	46	42	53
Mean daily sunshine hours	8.0	7.0	6.0	5.0	4.0	4.0	4.0	5.0	5.0	6.0	6.0	8.0	5.7
Average ultraviolet index	12.2	11.2	8.5	5.5	3.3	2.5	2.7	3.8	5.8	8.1	10.2	11.8	7.1
Source: Bureau of Meteorology
