= Green Valley, Western Australia =

Locality in the City of Albany, Western Australia

Green Valley
- Interactive map of Green Valley
- Coordinates: 34°52′46″S 117°49′21″E
- Country: Australia
- State: Western Australia
- LGA: City of Albany

Government
  - State electorate: Albany
  - Federal division: O'Connor

Area
  - Total: 63.5 km^{2} (24.5 sq mi)

Population
  - Total: 57 (2021)
  - Density: 0.898/km^{2} (2.325/sq mi)
- Postcode: 6328

Green Valley is a locality of the City of Albany in the Great Southern region of Western Australia. The Albany Highway forms the western border of the locality.

The Mill Brook Nature Reserve takes up a substantial part of the locality in the north-east.

== Demographics ==
As of the 2021 Australian census, 57 people resided in Green Valley. This is up from 50 in the 2016 census. The median age of persons in Green Valley was 49 years. There were fewer males than females, with 47.5% of the population male and 52.5% female. The average household size was 3.2 people per household.

== Nature reserve ==
The Mill Brook Nature Reserve was gazetted on 3 October 1924, has a size of 14.84 square kilometres (5.73 mi^{2}), and is located within the Jarrah Forest bioregion.

The brook flowing through the locality and nature reserve, the Mill Brook, has a catchment area of 180 square kilometres (69 mi^{2}).
