= Palmdale, Western Australia =

Locality in the City of Albany, Western Australia

Palmdale
- Interactive map of Palmdale
- Coordinates: 34.70569°S 118.13611°E
- Country: Australia
- State: Western Australia
- LGA: City of Albany
- Location: 375 km (233 mi) SE of Perth; 33 km (21 mi) NE of Albany

Government
  - State electorate: Albany
  - Federal division: O'Connor

Area
  - Total: 158.2 km^{2} (61.1 sq mi)

Population
  - Total: 18 (SAL 2021)
- Postcode: 6328
Localities around Palmdale
Takalarup	Takalarup	South Stirling
Napier	Palmdale	Manypeaks
Napier	Kalgan	Manypeaks

Palmdale is a rural locality of the City of Albany in the Great Southern region of Western Australia. The Kalgan River forms the western boundary of the locality, with the Granite Hill Nature Reserve stretching along the river in the north of Palmdale.

Palmdale is on the traditional land of the Minang people of the Noongar nation.

== Nature reserves ==
The Granite Hill Nature Reserve was gazetted on 3 June 1988, has a size of 1.27 square kilometres (0.49 mi^{2}), and is located within the Jarrah Forest bioregion. Only the parts east of the Kalgan River are located within Palmdale, the remainder being in Napier. Additionally the unnamed Nature Reserve WA23850 is fully located within Palmdale. It was gazetted on 11 December 1953, has a size of 3.63 square kilometres (1.40 mi^{2}), and is also located within the Jarrah Forest bioregion.
