= Porongurup, Western Australia =

Locality in the Shire of Plantagenet, Western Australia

Porongurup
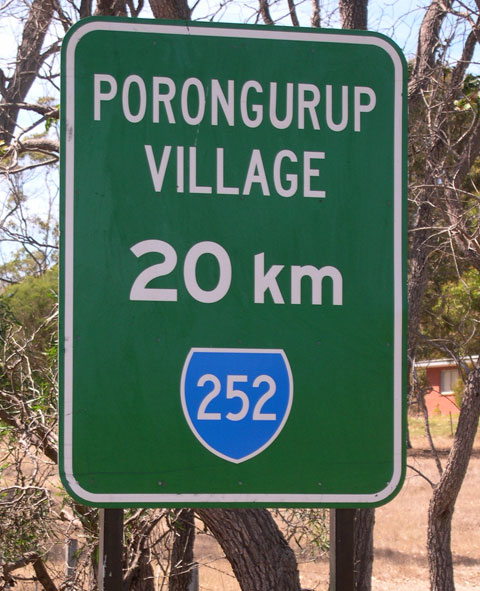
- Roadside sign near Mount Barker

- Interactive map of Porongurup
- Coordinates: 34°40′00″S 117°52′00″E
- Country: Australia
- State: Western Australia
- LGA: Shire of Plantagenet
- Location: 360 km (220 mi) south east of Perth; 45 km (28 mi) north of Albany; 15 km (9.3 mi) east of Mount Barker

Government
  - State electorate: Warren-Blackwood
  - Federal division: O'Connor

Area
  - Total: 212.1 km^{2} (81.9 sq mi)
- Elevation: 269 m (883 ft)

Population
  - Total: 342 (SAL 2021)
- Postcode: 6324
Localities around Porongurup
Mount Barker	Woogenellup	Takalarup
Mount Barker	Porongurup	Takalarup
Narrikup	Narrikup	Napier

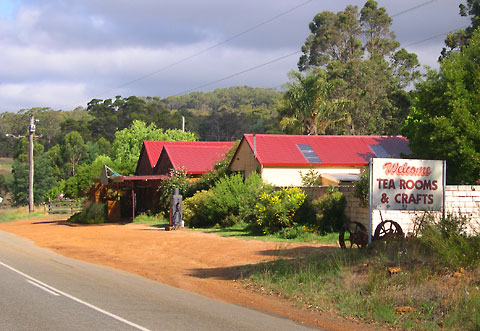
Tea Rooms, Porongurup

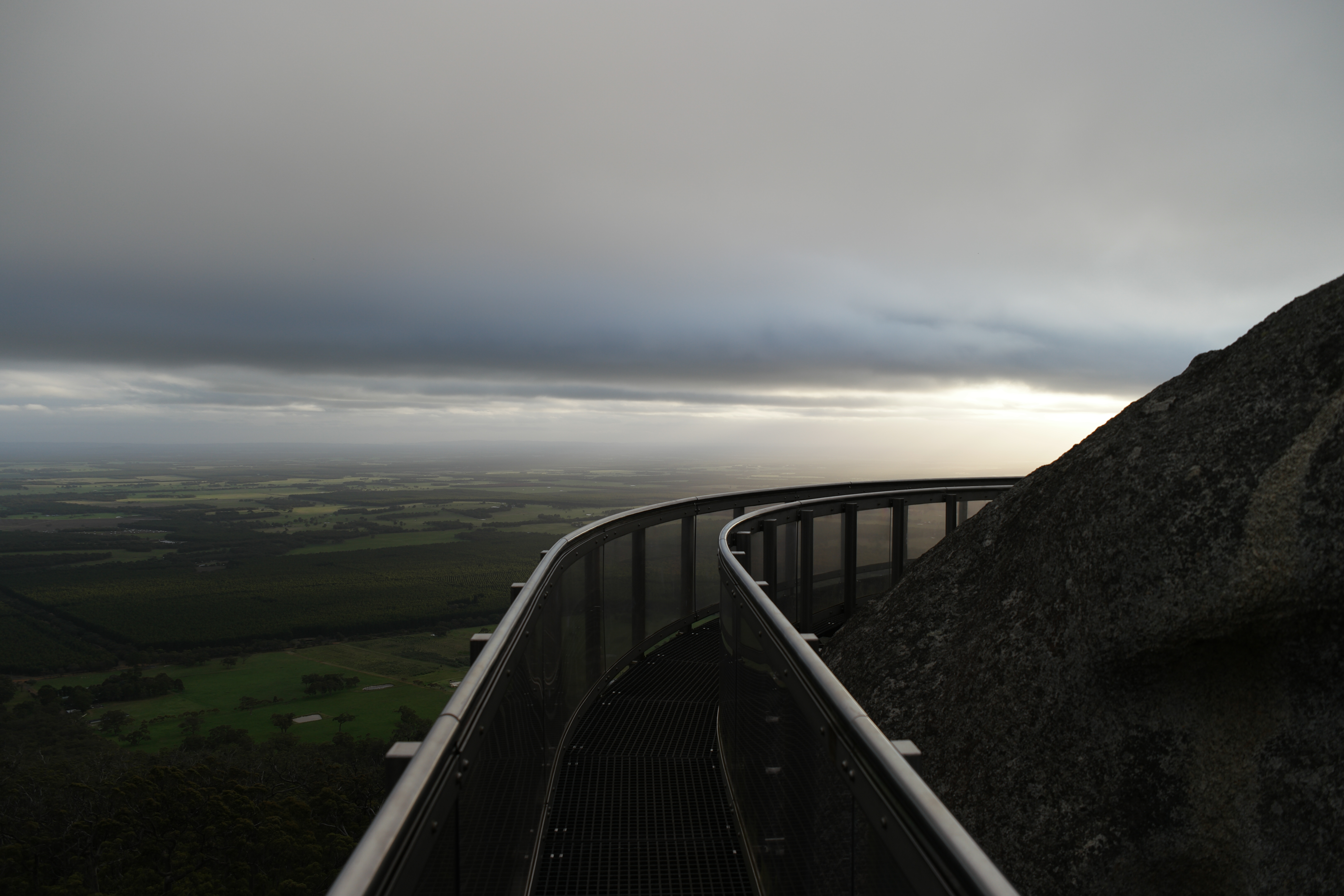
Granite Skywalk on Castle Rock in the Porongurup National Park, 2015

Porongurup is a locality of the Shire of Plantagenet in the Great Southern region of Western Australia. At the 2006 census, Porongurup had a population of 370. The name is derived from the Aboriginal place-name, and consequently arrived with no spelling as such. A common alternative spelling is Porongorup and while some maps still show this spelling, state government signs around the town use Porongurup, as does the promotion association for the region.

== Industry ==
The main industry in the region is dairying, but some vegetable crops grown as well.

As with other parts of the lower Great Southern region of Western Australia, silviculture, specifically plantations of Tasmanian blue gums, is becoming a notable, and sometimes controversial, industry in Porongurup.

=== Tourism ===
Tourism based on the Porongurup Range's giant karri forests is limited by the difficulty of access because the nearest public transport is in Albany and Mount Barker. The mountain range includes Castle Rock, a popular climbing destination, and the Devils Slide. The Granite Skywalk is a suspended walkway that spirals around the granite outcrop of Castle Rock in Porongurup National Park. Eucalypt forest and rounded granite knobs and boulders give way to views over the Stirling Range and towards Esperance.

A popular annual event is "Art in the Park", an outdoor sculpture competition in the picnic area on Castle Rock Road in the national park. The week-long event is held in April and attracts a diverse range of traditional and contemporary works vying for cash prizes.

=== Wine region ===
Viticulture is a relatively young but flourishing industry in the region with eleven local wineries listed on the Porongurup Promotion Association web-page as of March 2007. The Porongurup Wine Festival is a 40+ year event that has been held at various different local wineries each year. Pre-Covid, it was held in March but from 2024, the event will expand to become the Great Southern Wine Festival and will be held in September at rotating locations in the Great Southern wine appellation.

Porongurup is the fifth of the subregions of the Great Southern wine region, bordering Mount Barker on its western boundary. Harvesting takes place from mid-March to early May. The chief viticultural hazard is birds.

== Environment ==
In July and August 2006 eight noisy scrubbirds were released in the Porongurup Range by the Department of Environment and Conservation, Western Australia, as part of a trans-location program for the conservation of this endangered species.

== History ==
Fire-scarred farmland, February 2007

On 11 February 2007, a fire began on private property near the north-west corner of the national park, around 8 kilometres (5 mi) west of the Porongurup village. The fire spread along the rear boundaries of several properties and into the national park. Fire crews helped prevent the fire spreading to nearby housing throughout Sunday night but on Monday afternoon (12 February) it jumped Porongurup-Mt Barker Road and spread into private property to the north-east of the village centre. One private residence and a number of farm sheds and buildings were destroyed and other buildings seriously damaged in the fire. Fire crews, including aerial support from six water bomber planes, battled the blaze and by Tuesday morning it was effectively under control. By Wednesday morning (14 February) the fire had burnt through around 95% of the national park and several farms and wineries showed the scars of the fire.

It was reportedly the most devastating fire in the region since the 1960s. Less than a week after the fire began, a committee was formed to take charge of remedial work in the community and in a show of resilience, local wineries still held their annual wine festival a few weeks later. Despite the national park remaining closed to visitors, the annual Art in the Park exhibition was allowed to go ahead in early April.

Sections of the park, including the Castle Rock walk trail and the Tree in The Rock picnic area, were reopened to the general public in September 2007.
