= Napier, Western Australia =

Locality in the City of Albany, Western Australia

Napier
- Interactive map of Napier
- Coordinates: 34.77392°S 117.98108°E
- Country: Australia
- State: Western Australia
- LGA: City of Albany
- Location: 374 km (232 mi) SE of Perth; 20 km (12 mi) N of Albany

Government
  - State electorate: Albany
  - Federal division: O'Connor

Area
  - Total: 265 km^{2} (102 sq mi)

Population
  - Total: 269 (SAL 2021)
- Postcode: 6330
Localities around Napier
Porongurup	Takalarup	Palmdale
Narrikup	Napier	Kalgan
Millbrook	King River	Kalgan

Napier is a rural locality of the City of Albany in the Great Southern region of Western Australia. The Kalgan River forms the north-eastern boundary of the locality, with the Granite Hill Nature Reserve stretching along the river in this section. The Napier Nature Reserve is also located within Napier. Chester Pass Road passes through Napier from south to north.

Napier is on the traditional land of the Minang people of the Noongar nation.

The heritage listed Napier Hall is located within Napier and dates back to 1954. Prior to this, from 1938, when a new school was built, the old Napier school building was used as a community hall.

== Nature reserves ==
The Granite Hill Nature Reserve was gazetted on 3 June 1988, has a size of 1.27 square kilometres (0.49 mi^{2}), and is located within the Jarrah Forest bioregion. The parts west of the Kalgan River, the majority, are located within Napier, the remainder being in Palmdale. The Napier Nature Reserve was gazetted on 14 November 1924, has a size of 2.19 square kilometres (0.85 mi^{2}), and is also located within the Jarrah Forest bioregion.

Additionally, the unnamed Nature Reserve WA25705 is fully located within Napier. It was gazetted on 15 July 1960, has a size of 2.63 square kilometres (1.02 mi^{2}), and is also located within the Jarrah Forest bioregion.

The small Takenup Road Nature Reserve, with a size of 0.01 square kilometres (0.0039 mi^{2}), is also located within Napier and the Jarrah Forest bioregion. It was gazetted on 14 December 1962.
