= Toolbrunup =

Mountain in Western Australia

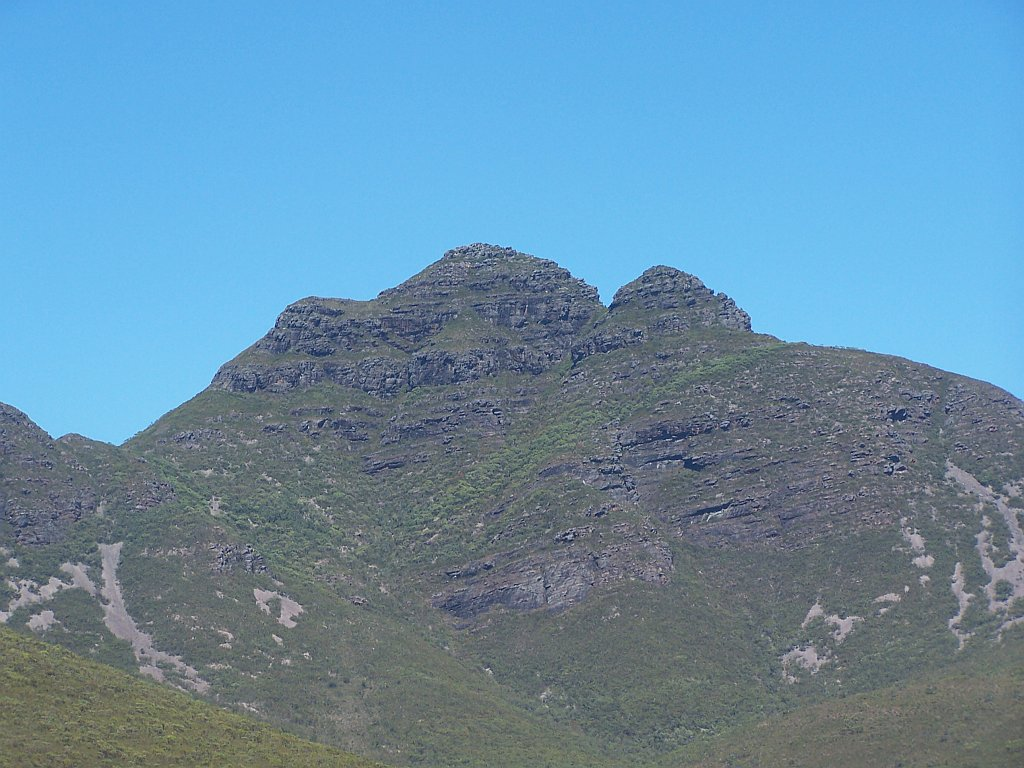

Highest point
- Elevation: 1,052 m (3,451 ft)
- Coordinates: 34°23′S 118°02′E

Geography
- Location: Great Southern of Western Australia
- Parent range: Stirling Range

Toolbrunup is among the highest peaks in the Stirling Ranges in Western Australia. Toolbrunup is made from sediments deposited during the Ediacaran period and later metamorphosed to quartzites and shales. These formation rocks were later folded during basement rock movement.

The first European to climb the peak was Robert Dale, who did so in 1832 when he passed through the area. John Septimus Roe did the same three years later and the botanist James Drummond followed in the 1840s and returned several times to collect and identify plants in the area.

The traditional owners of the area are the Minang and Koreng peoples. Toolbrunup shares its name with Lake Toolbrunup and the name is thought to mean "when all else was dry, Toolbrunup was sure to have water".
