= Stirling Range =

Mountain range in Great Southern region of Western Australia

Stirling Range (Koikyennuruff)
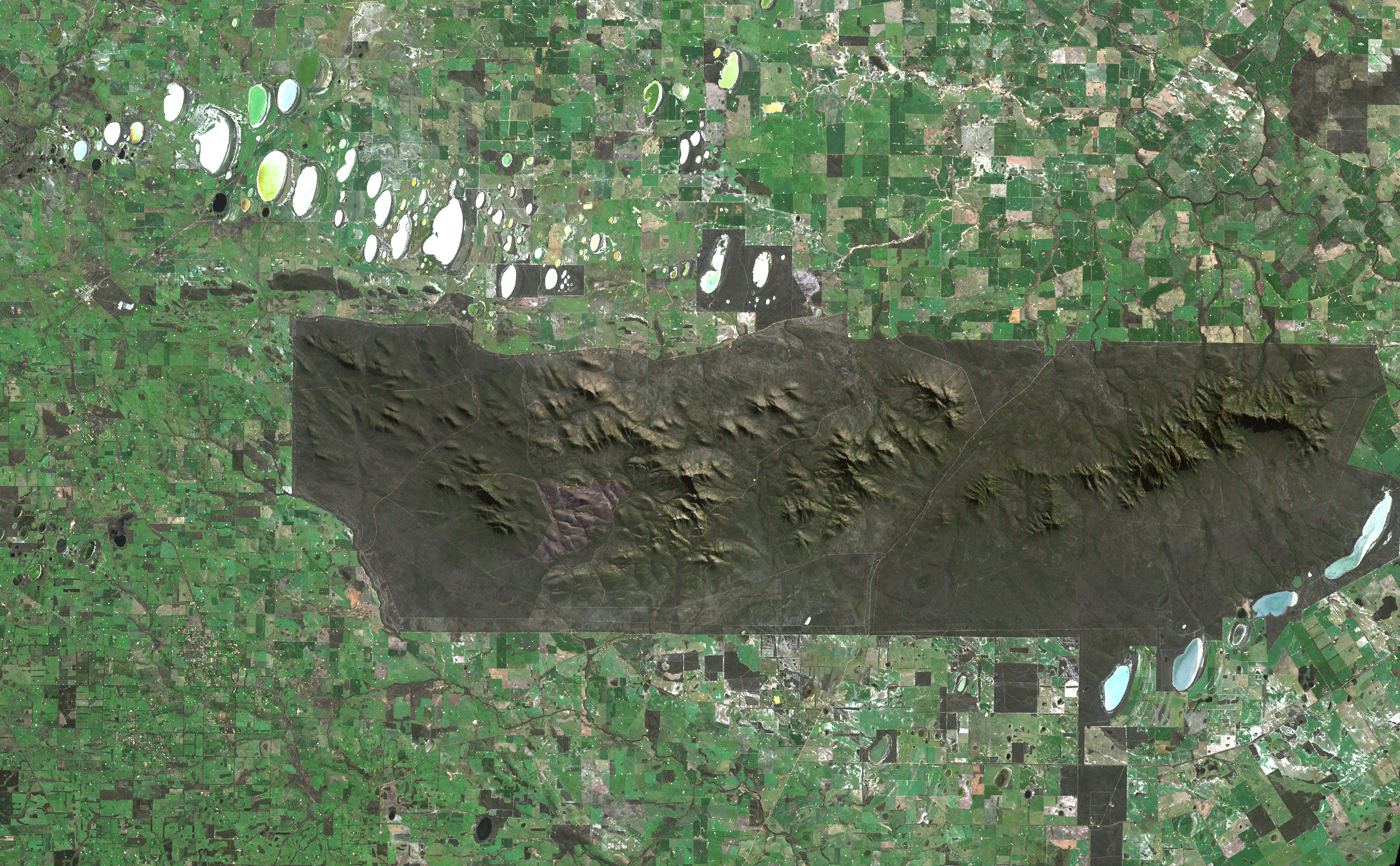
- Satellite image of the park. The sharp boundaries on all sides of the park show where agriculture immediately gives way to protected land.

Highest point
- Peak: Bluff Knoll
- Elevation: 1,099 m (3,606 ft)

Geography
- Location within Western Australia
- Country: Australia
- State: Western Australia
- Range coordinates: 34°24′S 118°09′E

The Stirling Range, also known as Koikyennuruff, is a range of mountains and hills in the Great Southern region of Western Australia, 337 kilometres (209 mi) south-east of Perth. It is over 60 kilometres (37 mi) wide from west to east, stretching from the highway between Mount Barker and Cranbrook eastward past Gnowangerup. The Stirling Range is protected by the Stirling Range National Park, which was gazetted in 1913, and has an area of 1,159 km^{2} (447 sq mi).

== Environment ==
=== Geology ===
The mountains are formed of metamorphic rock derived from quartz sandstones and shales deposited during the Paleoproterozoic Era, between 2,016 and 1,215 million years ago (based on U-Th-Pb isotope geochronology of monazite crystals). The sediments were subsequently metamorphosed 1,215 million years ago, and later folded during reactivation of basement structures recording lateral displacements between Antarctica and Australia. Despite the relative youth of the mountains, the soils remain very poor, creating the species-rich heathland flora.

=== Climate ===
As the only vertical obstacle to weather in any direction, the range tends to alter weather patterns around itself. Its upper slopes receive significantly more rainfall than surrounding areas. The branch of the Kalgan River that forms the southwestern border of the park is fed in large part from precipitation falling in the western half of the range.

The annual rainfall on the plains around the park is quite low compared with the rainy Porongurups to the south, averaging only 575 millimetres (23 inches) on the southern side and as little as 400 millimetres (16 inches) in Borden on the northern side. Although no rain gauges have been placed on the high peaks, the highest rainfall is estimated to be about 1000 mm (39 in) near Coyanarup Peak and Bluff Knoll. This is supported by distinctly moist-climate pockets of vegetation in some high valleys. Most rain falls between May and August, with summer being very frequently completely dry around Borden for over a month and having typically very light showers in the south and on the peaks.

Temperatures in the lowlands are generally warm. In the summer, average maxima typically are around 30 °C (86 °F) in Borden and about 27 °C (80 °F) in the southern plains. Summer minima range from about 16 °C (60 °F) in the south to 18 °C (64 °F) in Borden. In the winter, maximum temperatures typically are a very pleasant 16 °C (60 °F) and minima are about 8 °C (46.4 °F). On Bluff Knoll, winter temperatures range from maxima of about 11 °C (52 °F) to minima of 3 °C (37 °F). These are the lowest temperatures in Western Australia and consequently the Stirling Range occasionally receives snowfalls—the only place in Western Australia to regularly do so, though usually it is very light. Snow has been reported as early as 19 April 2019 and as late as 19 November 1992, but is mostly confined to the period from June to September.

=== Flora and fauna ===
The range is one of the richest areas for flora in the world. The low-nutrient soils support five major vegetation communities: (1) shrubland and (2) mallee-heathland at higher elevations; and (3) woodland, (4) wetland and (5) salt lake communities on lower slopes and plains. Ninety families, 384 genera, and over 1500 plant species occur there, 87 of which are found nowhere else. This represents more than a third of the known flora of the southwest, and includes more species of wildflowers than in the entire British Isles.

The range has been identified by BirdLife International as an Important Bird Area (IBA) because it supports populations of endangered short-billed black cockatoos and western whipbirds, and is visited by endangered long-billed black-cockatoos. Significant biome-restricted or range-restricted bird species found in the range include red-capped and regent parrots, western rosellas, rufous treecreepers, red-winged and blue-breasted fairywrens, purple-gaped honeyeaters, western spinebills, western thornbills, western yellow and white-breasted robins, and red-eared firetails.

The range is an important site for endemic mygalomorph spiders, and for land snails. Some 20 species of native mammals, including the reintroduced numbat, have been recorded.

== History ==
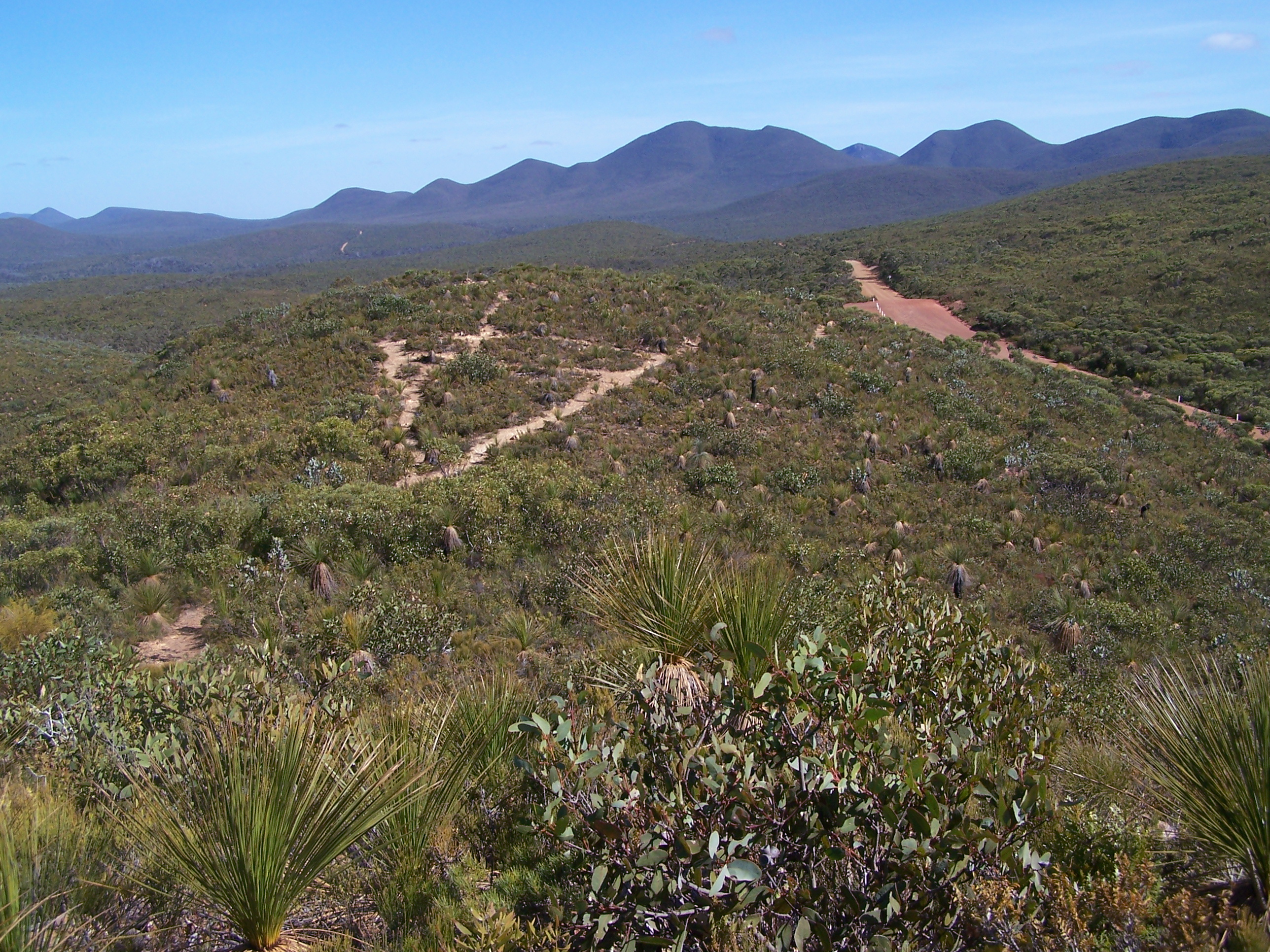
Heath habitat looking west from lookout in approx centre of ranges

The plains in the Stirling Range region were the hunting grounds for small groups of Indigenous Australians for thousands of years before European settlement. At least two tribes frequented the area: the Qaaniyan people in the west, and the Koreng people in the east. The Stirling Range played an important role in their culture, appearing in a number of Dreamtime stories.

The first recorded sighting of the Stirling Range by a European explorer was by Matthew Flinders on 5 January 1802. While sailing along the south coast of Australia, just east of King George Sound, he noted at a distance of eight leagues (39 km or 24 mi) inland a chain of rugged mountains, the easternmost of which he named Mount Rugged (now called Bluff Knoll).

An army garrison was established at King George Sound in 1826, and the following year the commanding officer, Major Edmund Lockyer, explored the land north of the Sound. On 11 February 1827, he observed mountains in the distance running east and west about 64 kilometres (40 miles).

Alexander Collie explored to the north of the Sound in 1831. On 29 April, he described the Stirling Range and recorded names for the main peaks. The following year, Robert Dale led an expedition to the Range. On 24 January 1832, he made the first recorded ascent of a peak in the Stirling Range, scaling Toolbrunup. Late in 1835, Governor James Stirling and John Septimus Roe led an expedition from Albany to Perth. They first saw the Stirling Range on 3 November, and on travelling closer to them the following day, Roe gave them their name. Because Stirling personally led the Pinjarra massacre and later threatened the Noongar people with genocide, there are some calls to rename the Stirling Range.

Early exploitation of the Stirling Range included cutting of sandalwood and kangaroo hunting. The Range was never formally taken up for grazing, probably because of the many poison bushes in the area. However, squatters ran sheep to the south of the Range in the 1850s, and in the 1860s a selection was taken up at the base of Mount Trio.

The area that is now the Stirling Range National Park was temporarily reserved in April 1908, and formally gazetted as Western Australia's third national park in June 1913.

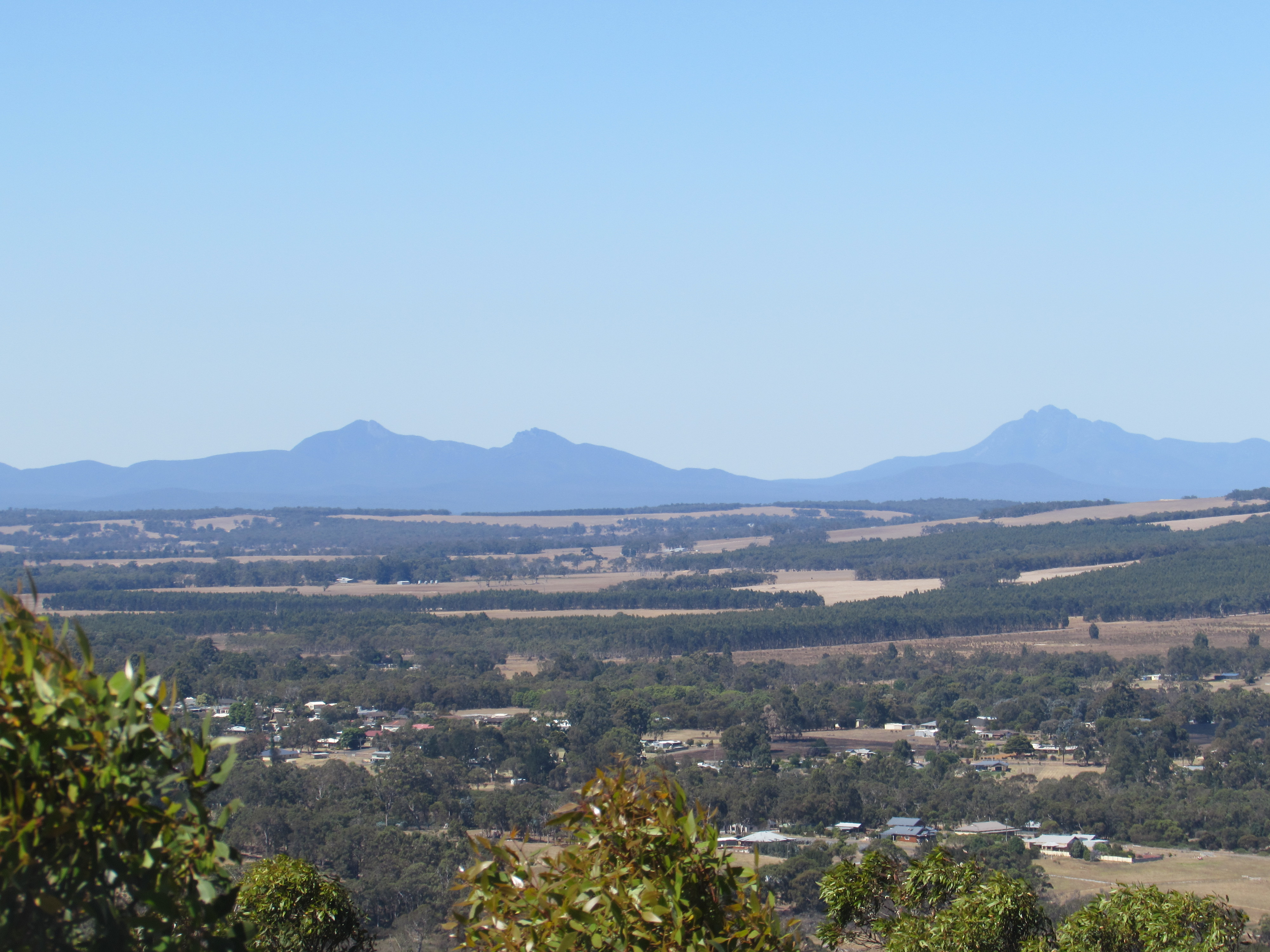
Stirling Range from Mount Barker Rotary Lookout

== Attractions and activities ==
Notable features include Toolbrunup, Bluff Knoll (the tallest peak for a thousand kilometres or more in any direction and most popular tourist attraction), and a silhouette called The Sleeping Princess which is visible from the Porongurup Range. Popular recreational activities include bushwalking, abseiling and gliding. Camping is not permitted within the park boundaries.

=== Major peaks ===
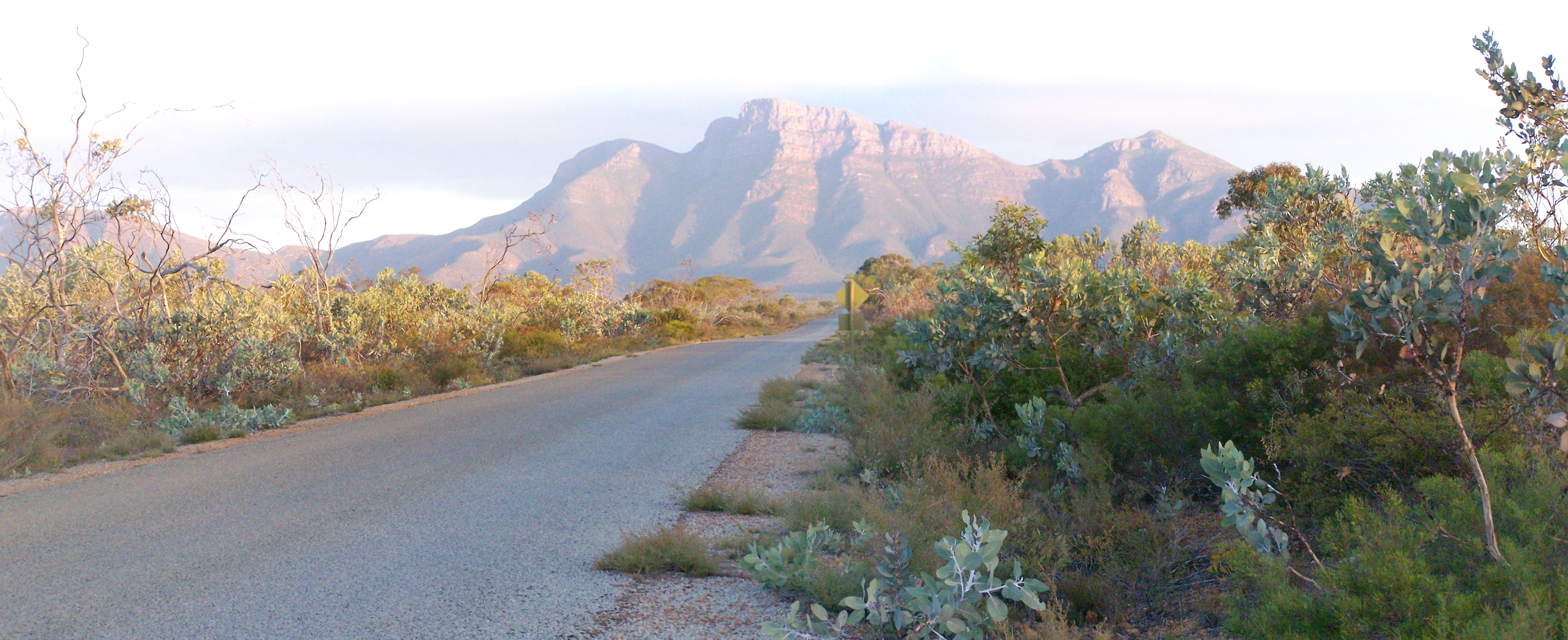
Bluff Knoll, as seen from near the corner of Chester Pass Road and Bluff Knoll access road

- Bluff Knoll—34°22′S 118°15′E, 1,095 m (3,593 ft)
- Mount Hassell— 34°22′S 118°04′E, 847 m (2,779 ft)
- Mount Magog— 34°23′S 117°56′E, 856 m (2,808 ft)
- Mount Trio— 34°20′S 118°06′E, 856 m (2,808 ft)
- Talyuberlup Peak— 34°24′S 117°57′E, 783 m (2,569 ft)
- Toolbrunup— 34°23′S 118°02′E, 1,052 m (3,451 ft)

== Sources ==
- Cross, Joseph, ed. (1833). Journals of Several Expeditions Made in Western Australia, during the years 1829, 1830, 1831, and 1832; under the Sanction of the Governor, Sir James Stirling, Containing the Latest Authentic Information Relative to That Country, Accompanied by a Map (PDF). Holborn: Joseph Cross. Wikidata Q19113848.
  - Collie, Alexander (1833). "Account of an Excursion to the North of King George's Sound, between the 26th of April, and the 4th of May, 1831, by Al. Collie, Surgeon". In Cross (1833), pp. 132–154.
  - Dale, Robert (1833). "Mr. Dale's Journal of an Expedition from King George's Sound to the Koikyennuruff Range of Mountains". In Cross (1833), pp. 161–167.
- Flinders, Matthew (17 July 2004) [1814]. Col Choat (ed.). A Voyage to Terra Australis: Undertaken for the Purpose of Completing the Discovery of that Vast Country, and Prosecuted in the Years 1801, 1802, and 1803, in His Majesty's Ship the Investigator. Vol. 1. Project Gutenberg. Wikidata Q133873318.
