= Castle Rock, Western Australia =

Rock in Porongurup Ranges, Western Australia

Coordinates: 34°41′42.72″S 117°55′12.56″E

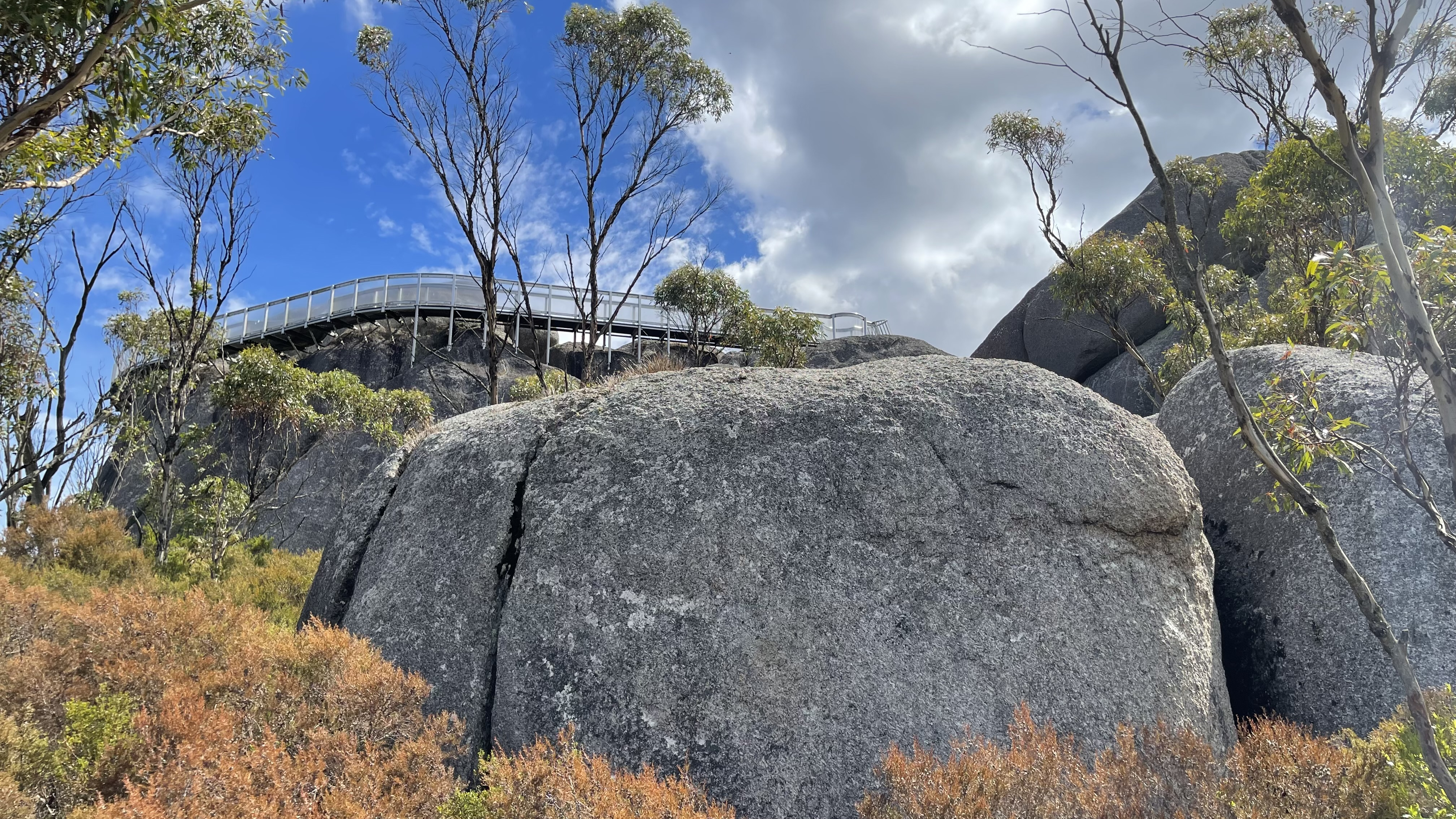
View of Granite Skywalk at summit from lower platform

Castle Rock is a tourist attraction in the Porongurup Range in the Great Southern region of Western Australia, and is renowned for its fauna and flora.

== Description ==
There is a walk trail called Castle Rock Walk Trail to the summit that offers 360 degree views, 570 metres (1,870 ft) above sea level from a lookout known as Granite Skywalk. The trail also takes in the unusual Balancing Rock, a 6-metre-high (20 ft) granite boulder that reportedly weighs around 186 tonnes (410 thousand pounds) yet rests on a base of just 1.21 square metres (13.02 sq ft).

Granite Skywalk was refurbished and reopened in 2012, allowing for a greater viewing experience and accommodating more pedestrians on it. A lower platform is accessible for those that are less able to climb to, and then ascend, the steep, caged, ladder to Granite Skywalk.

The rock formation was once named Alfred's Castle by Alfred Meadows Gillam.

A winery located on the eastern slopes of the range is named after this landmark.

== Gallery ==
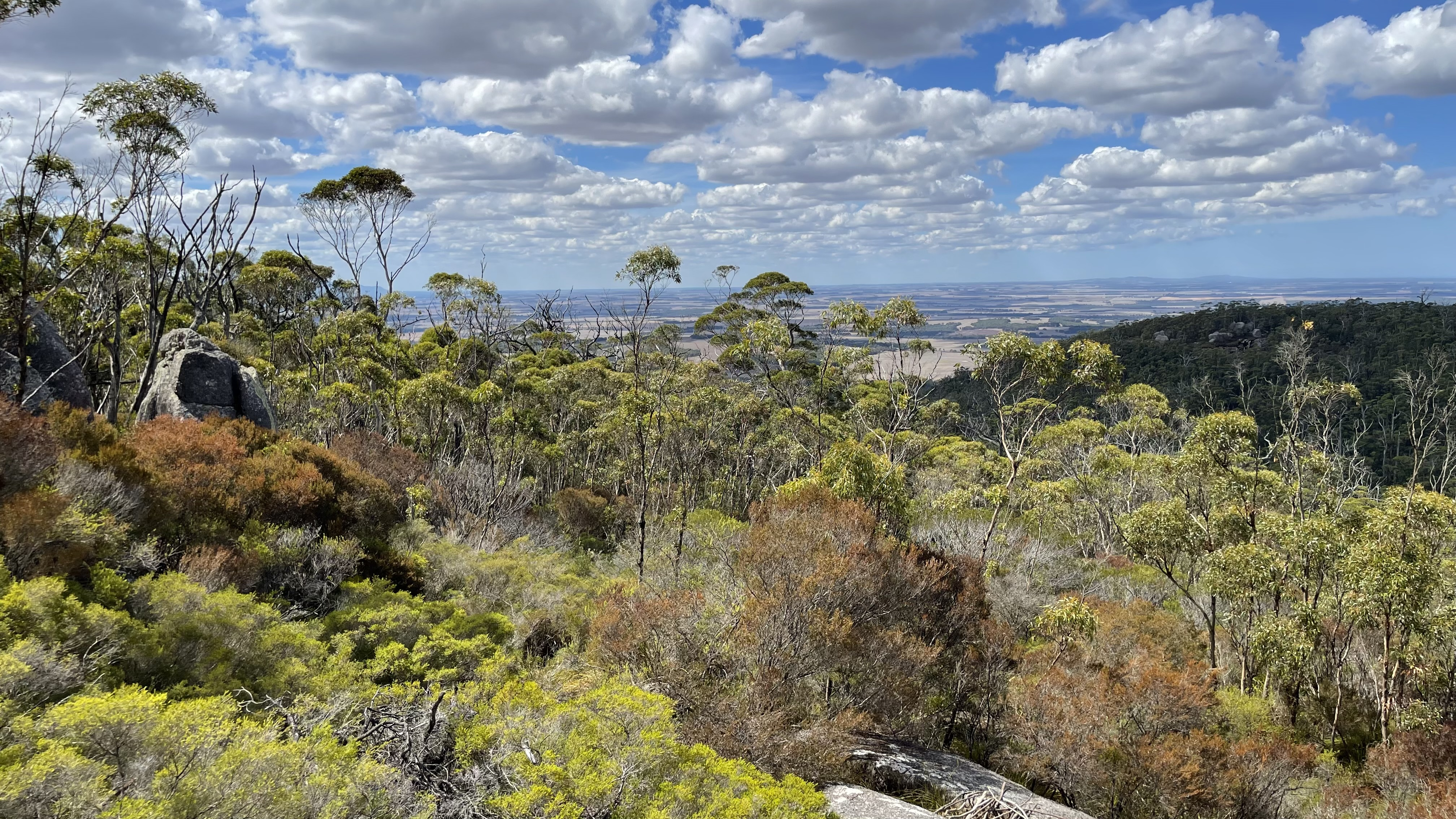
View from lower platform

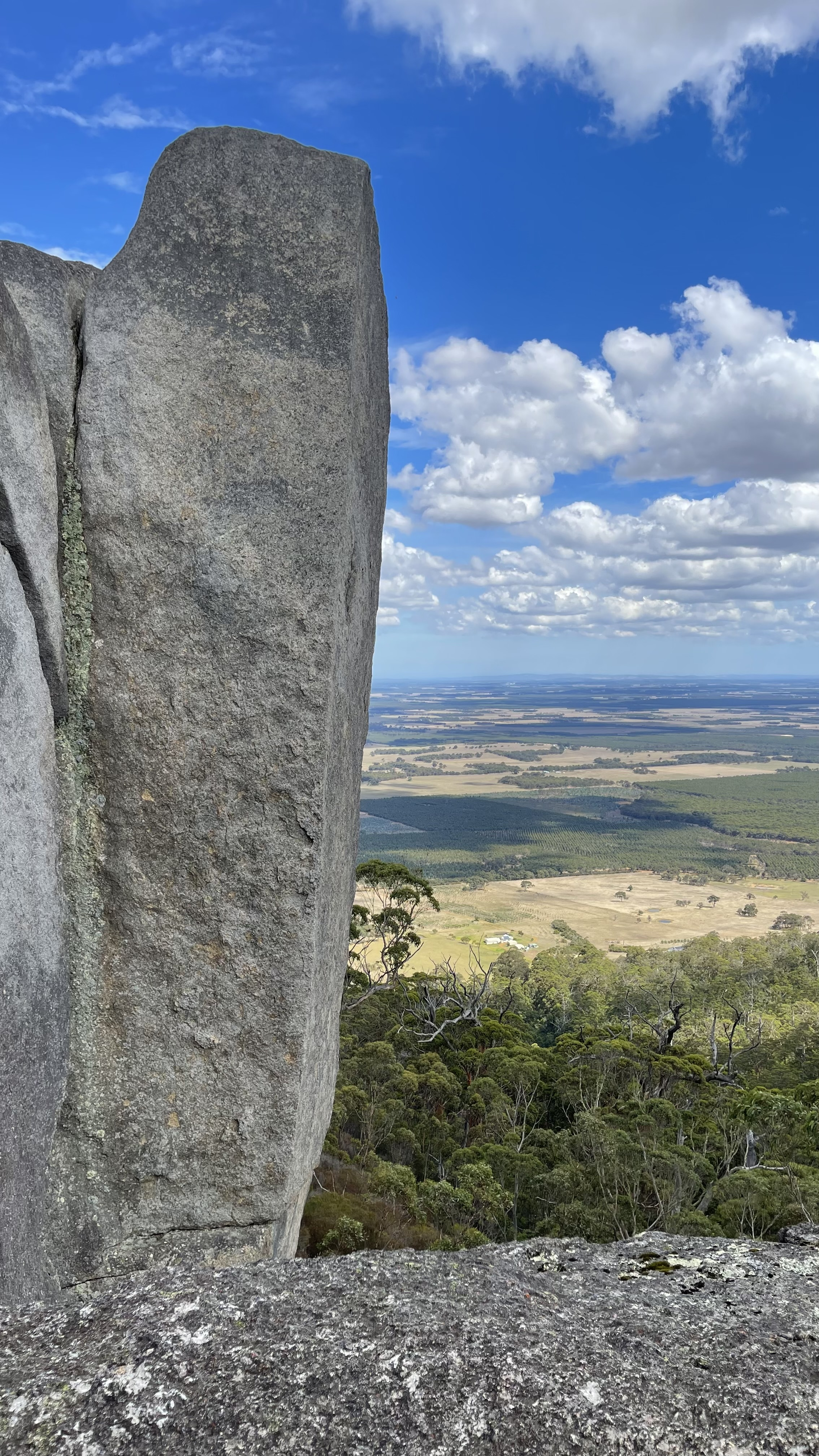
At bottom of ladder

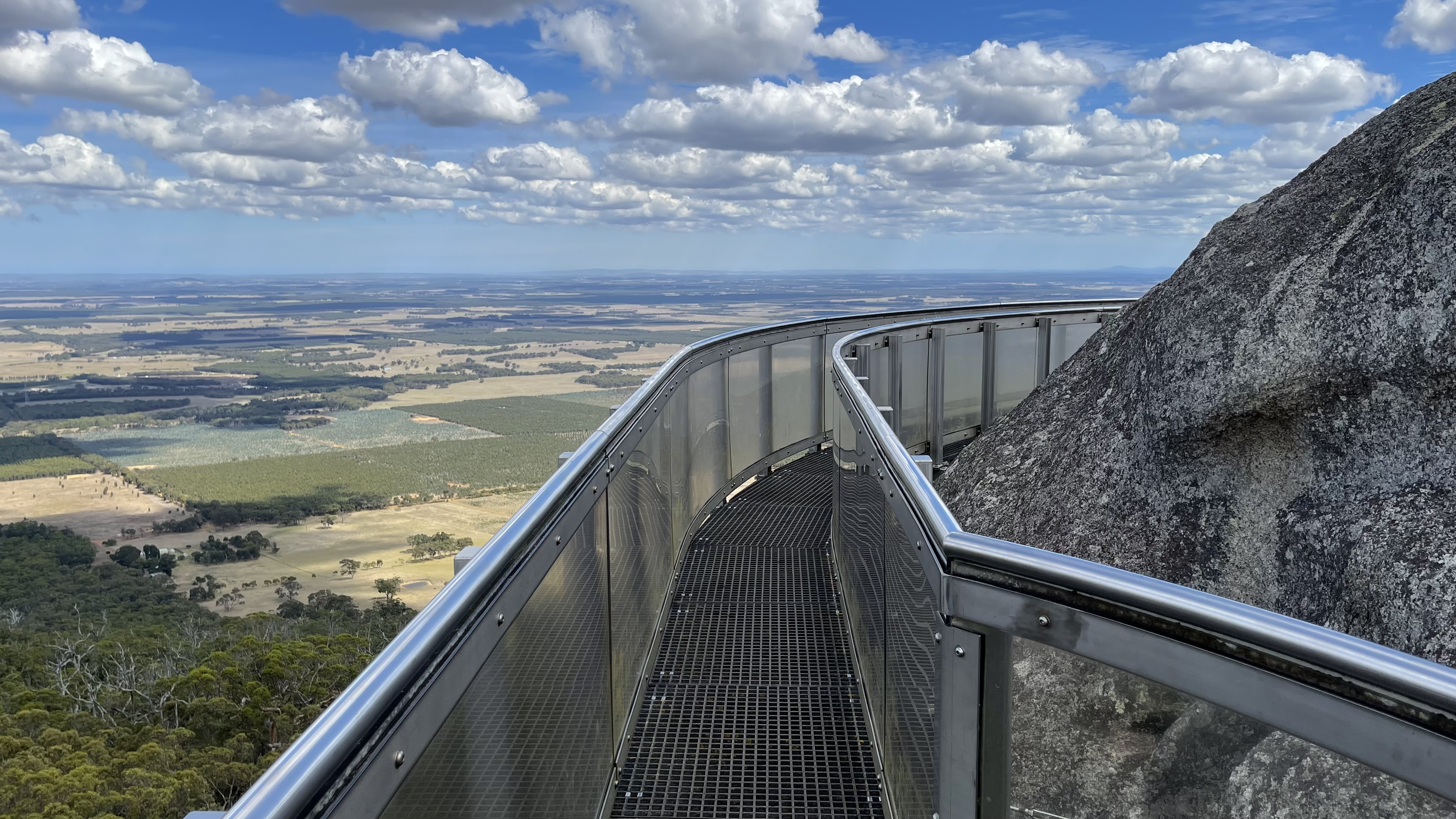
Granite Skywalk

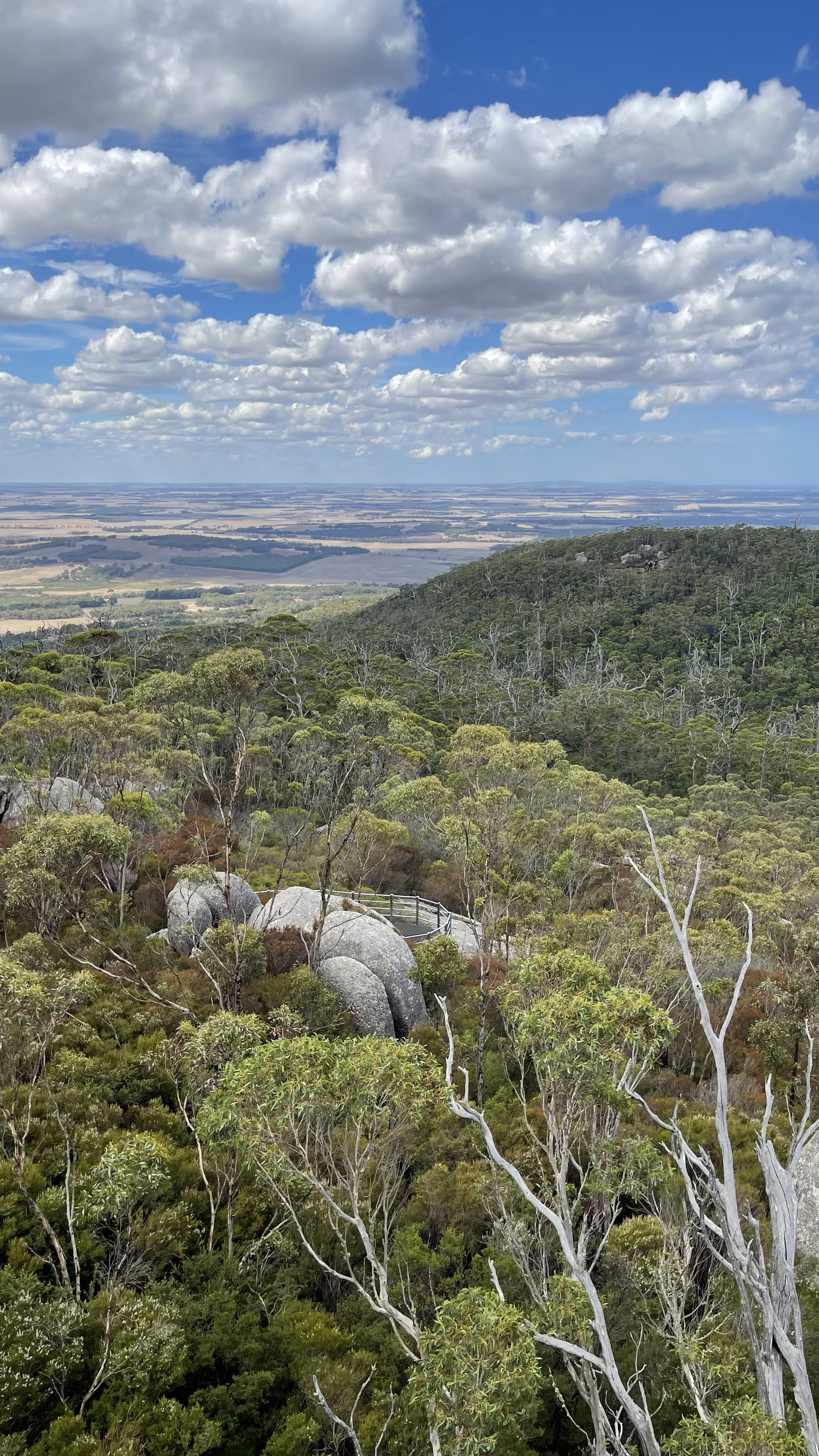
Lower platform

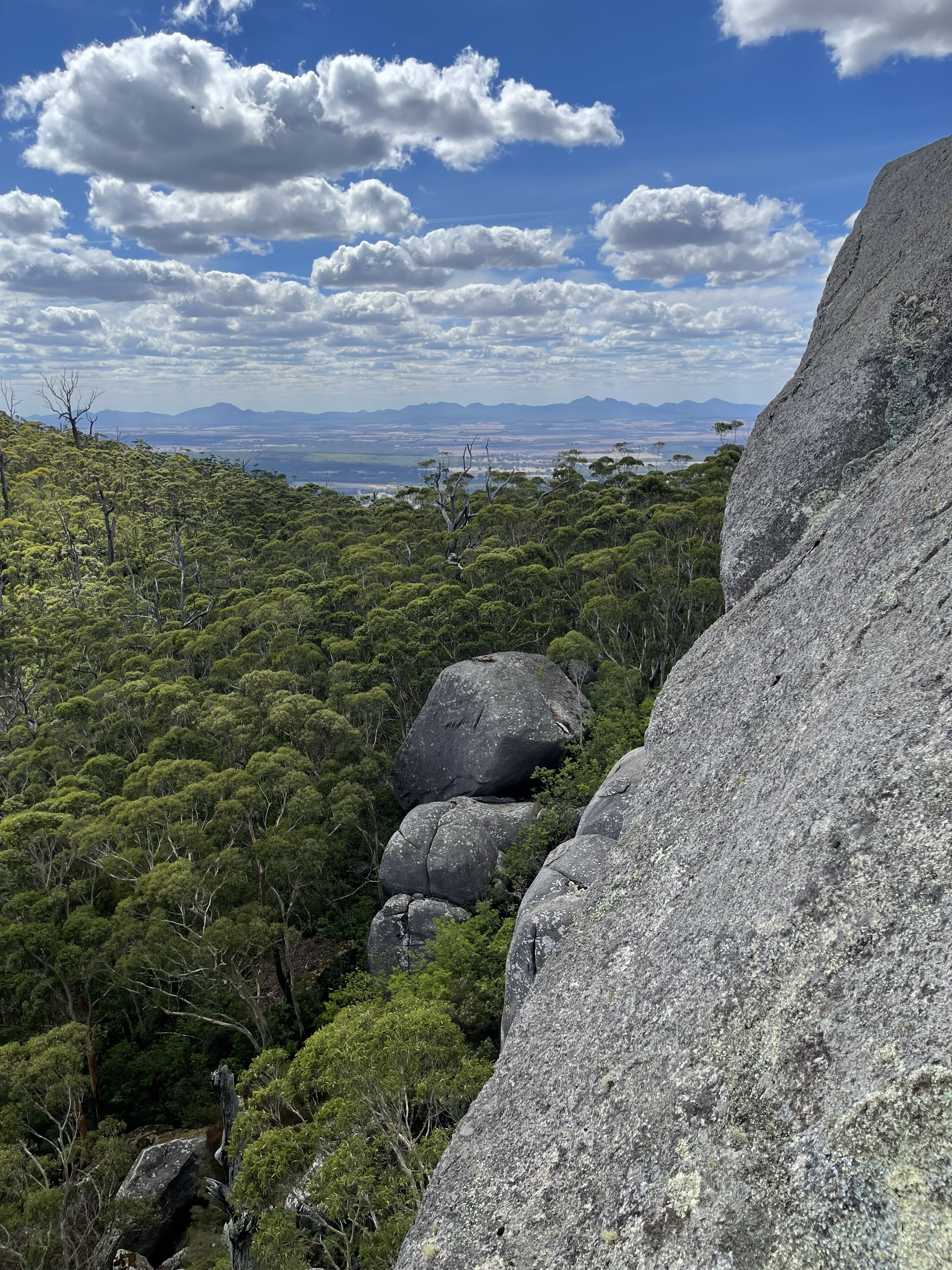
View from skywalk towards Stirling Range National Park

== Sources ==
- Olver, Rob; Olver, Stuart (1998). Dawn Till Dusk in the Stirling and Porongurup Ranges. Nedlands: Tuart House. ISBN 1876268093. LCCN 99458633. OCLC 39075537. OL 116432M.
- Alfred's Castle plaque (Metal). Castle Rock. n.d. "This rock was found & named Alfreds Castle by Alfred Meadows Gillam 1846 1930."
