= Porongurup National Park =

National park in Western Australia

- IUCN category II (national park)
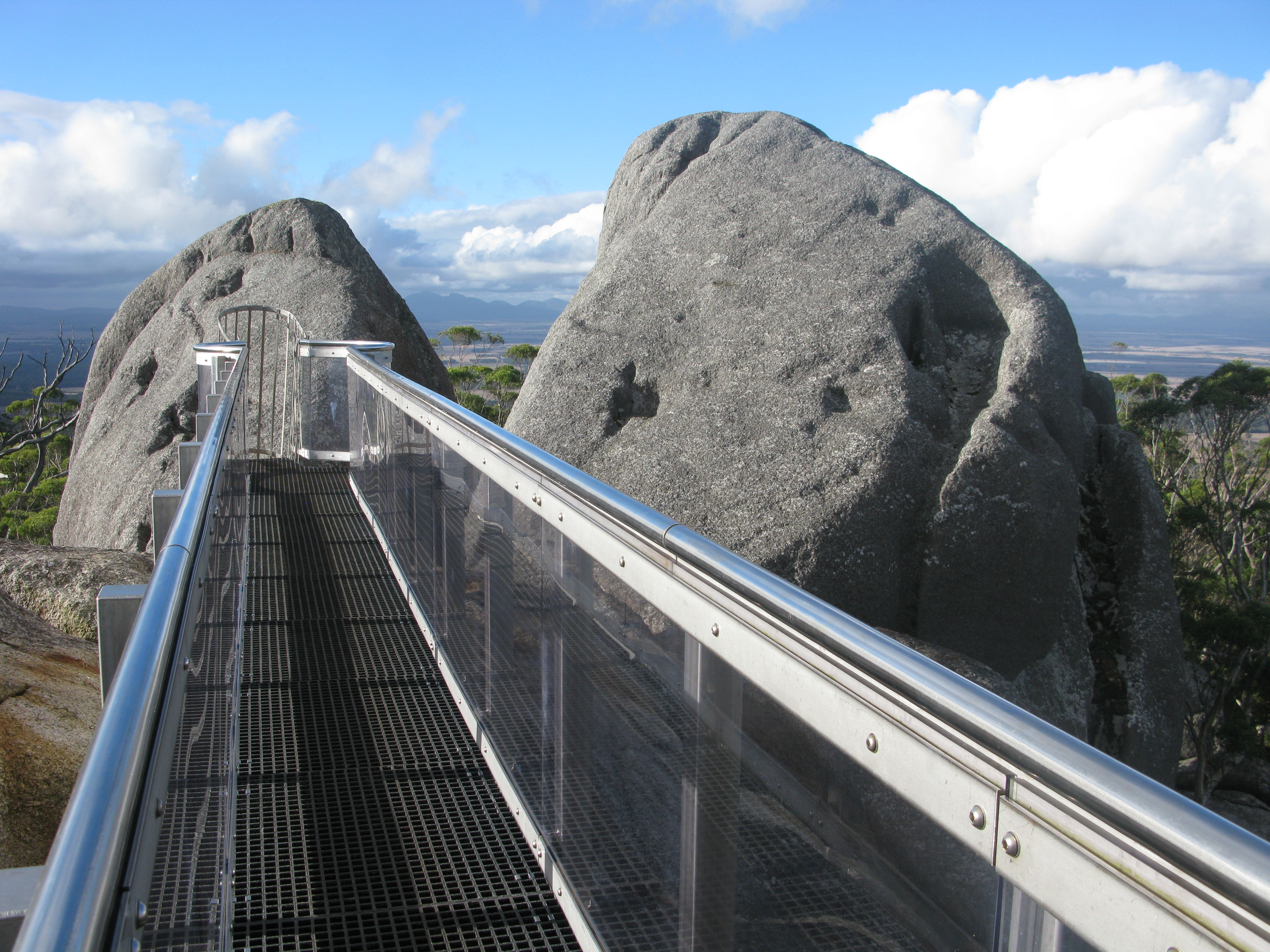
- The Castle Rock skywalk

- Location within Western Australia
- Location: Western Australia
- Nearest city: Mount Barker, Western Australia
- Coordinates: 34°40′46″S 117°52′23″E
- Area: 26.21 km^{2} (10.12 sq mi)
- Established: 1971
- Governing body: Department of Parks and Wildlife
- Website: Official website

Register of the National Estate
- Official name: Porongurup National Park
- Type: Natural
- Designated: 21 March 1978
- Reference no.: 9385
- Place File Number: 5/01/081/0003

Australian National Heritage List
- Official name: Porongurup National Park
- Type: Natural
- Designated: 4 August 2009
- Reference no.: 105982
- Place File Number: 5/01/081/0035

Porongurup National Park is a national park in the Great Southern region of Western Australia. It covers 26.21 square kilometres (10.12 sq mi), and is 360 kilometres (220 mi) southeast of Perth and 40 kilometres (25 mi) north of Albany.

The park contains the Porongurup Range, which is the relic core of an ancient mountain range formed in the Precambrian over 1200 million years ago. The Porongurup Range forms part of the Southwest Biodiversity Hotspot, which is one of 34 regions in the world noted for a rich diversity of flora and fauna species. The range contains many peaks and hiking trails, with the highest point being Devils Slide at 670 metres (2,200 ft), followed by Nancy's Peak at 644 metres (2,113 ft). Castle Rock (558 metres or 1,831 feet) is capped with the Granite Skywalk, a steel viewing platform that provides panoramic views of the surrounding karri forest.

== History ==
The Porongurup Range is culturally significant to the Mineng and Koreng (also spelled Goreng) sub-groups of the Noongar people. Minang man Larry Blight states:

This is our most sacred site...Porongurup or "Borrongup" means 'totem' in Noongar – a totem could be an animal or a plant that we inherit from our mother’s and father’s side when we are born.

The Porongurup Range was first sighted by Europeans passing near Albany in 1802 but farming in the surrounding districts did not start until around 1859 when vegetables were first grown on the southern slopes of the range. The giant karri and jarrah trees of the range were first harvested for timber in the 1880s and timber leases did not begin to be withdrawn until 1925. The National Park was not gazetted officially until 1971, with an area of 1,157 hectares (2,860 acres). This has since been increased to 2,511 hectares (6,200 acres).

== Geomorphology ==
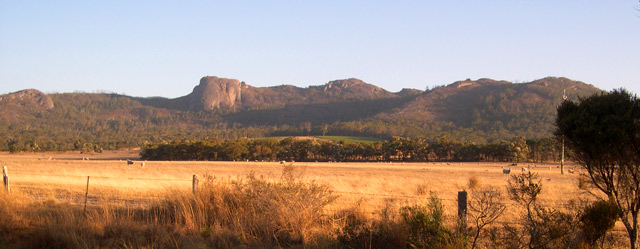
Porongurup Range

The Porongurup Range is 15 kilometres (9.3 mi) from east to west and consists of porphyritic granite peaks levelled into domes. The range is the remnant of a sizeable reservoir of molten granite that bubbled up when the Antarctic continent struck Australia in the Stenian Period of the Mesoproterozoic Era, around 1.2 billion years ago.

The sea levels of the late Cretaceous were around 100 metres (330 ft) higher than today and during this time the Porongurup Range was an island surrounded by the sea.

== Ecology ==
=== Flora ===
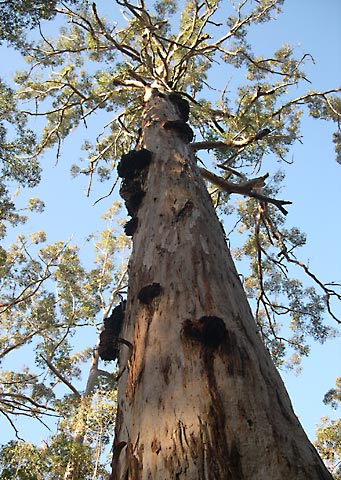
Karri in the Porongurups

The Porongurup National Park contains over 700 native plant species and at least 300 macrofungi species. At least nine flora species are unique and found only in the park. Examples of plant groups present include: heaths (Epacridaceae), especially beard-heaths (Leucopogon); peas (Fabaceae), notably flame-peas (Chorizema), bitter-peas (Daviesia and Bossiaea) and poison-peas (Gastrolobium); native myrtles (Myrtaceae); pimeleas (Thymelaeaceae), notably rice flowers (Pimelea); sundews and pitcher plants (Nepenthales); bloodroots, conostyles, kangaroo paws and their allies (Haemodorales); and banksias and grevilleas (Proteales). It is also important for richness in lilies, orchids and allies (Liliales), notably native lilies (Anthericaceae), irises and allies (Iridaceae), and orchids (Orchidaceae).

High granite peaks create their own micro-climates due to their altitude and their capacity to attract topographic rainfall. This maintains cooler and moister climate conditions than the surrounding low-lying plains. A remnant island of karri forest prevails here, hundreds of kilometres east of the cool southwest cape where they are more commonly found. They thrive in the granitic soils (known as karri loam) and cool, moist air.

On lateritic soils downslope, the predominant type of vegetation is a mixed forest of jarrah and marri, whilst on the highly exposed and frequently waterlogged summits, an open mossy herbland prevails.

=== Fauna ===
The mammal species in the National Park include the western grey kangaroo (Macropus fuliginosus), brushtail possum (Trichosurus vulpecular), pygmy possum (Cercartetus concinnus), mardo (or yellow-footed antechinus – Antechinus flavipes leucogaster), mooti (or bush rat – Rattus fuscipes fuscipes), quenda (or southern brown bandicoot – Isoodon obesulus fusciventer) and honey possum (Tarsipes rostratus).

Seventy-one bird species including the red-eared firetail (Emblema oculata) and Baudin's black cockatoo (Calyptorhynchus baudinii) are also found in the park.

At least 17 reptile species are known to inhabit the park including King's skink (Egernia kingii), the southern heath monitor (Varanus rosenbergi) and the marbled gecko (Phyllodactylus marmoratus). Several tree frog and southern frog species are also evident.

Invertebrates present in the National Park include Gondwanan relictual species such as the Porongurup Trapdoor Spider (Cataxia bolganupensis) and the Proshermacha trapdoor spider, land snails (Bothriembryon spp.) and giant earthworms (Megacolex sp.). Other invertebrates include peacock spiders (Maratus sp), velvet worms (Onychophora) and the social crab spider (Diaea socialis).

== Climate ==
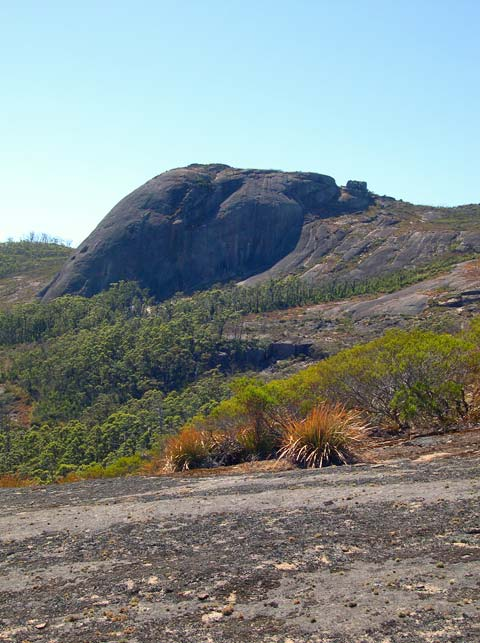
Gibraltar Rock, Porongurups

The plains surrounding the Porongurup Range have an annual rainfall of around 800 millimetres (31 in) to the south and around 600 millimetres (24 in) on the northern side. Most of this rain falls between April and October: although light showers are common in the summer months, the average rainfall between November and March totals only around 110 millimetres (4.3 in) in the southern plains and less than 75 millimetres (3.0 in) to the north. Summer temperatures on the plains average a very warm 26 °C (79 °F) in the daytime and decline to around 18 °C (64 °F) at night. In winter, although it can be rainy, temperatures average a very pleasant 16 °C (61 °F) during the day and a cool 8 °C (46 °F) in the morning.

Temperatures on the peaks are around 3 °C (5.4 °F) lower than on the plains, and snow has occasionally fallen on the ranges (heavily in October 1992 and June 1956).

=== Fire and cyclones ===
In 1978, Cyclone Alby felled many trees within the National Park (it was an unusual depression that produced very little rainfall after moving south of the Tropic of Capricorn).

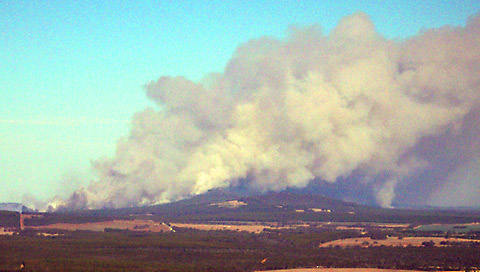
View of fire from Mount Barker – after approximately three hours burning

On 11 February 2007, a fire began on private property near the north-west corner of the park. It quickly spread into the native vegetation and raced up the steep slopes within hours. Volunteer fire crews and Department's firefighters battled the fast-moving blaze and managed to contain it overnight after it had burnt around 50% of the park. The fire broke containment lines on Monday afternoon (12 February) and spread further through the park and into private property to the north-east. Fire crews, including aerial support from six water bomber planes, continued the battle to contain the blaze and by Tuesday morning it was again under control though still burning freely within the containment zone. Water bombers paid special attention to tourist facilities and special habitats, including an area where endangered noisy scrub birds had been released. By Wednesday morning (14 February) the fire had burnt through around 95% of the national park.

As many of the trees and vegetation are native to the region, it is expected that the park will, to a large extent, recover in the months after the fire. By early April, Kingia australis plants were re-shooting and flowering abundantly in heavily burnt areas but the legacy of the fire will be felt for some time to come. Local populations of kangaroos and other wildlife were injured and local residents assisted in their care and recovery where possible. There has not been such a devastating fire in the region since the 1960s.

== Features ==
The park includes a number of significant tourist features and walk trails.

- Tree in the Rock
- Castle Rock
- Balancing Rock
- Gibraltar Rock
- Devils Slide
- Wansborough Pass
- Millinup Pass
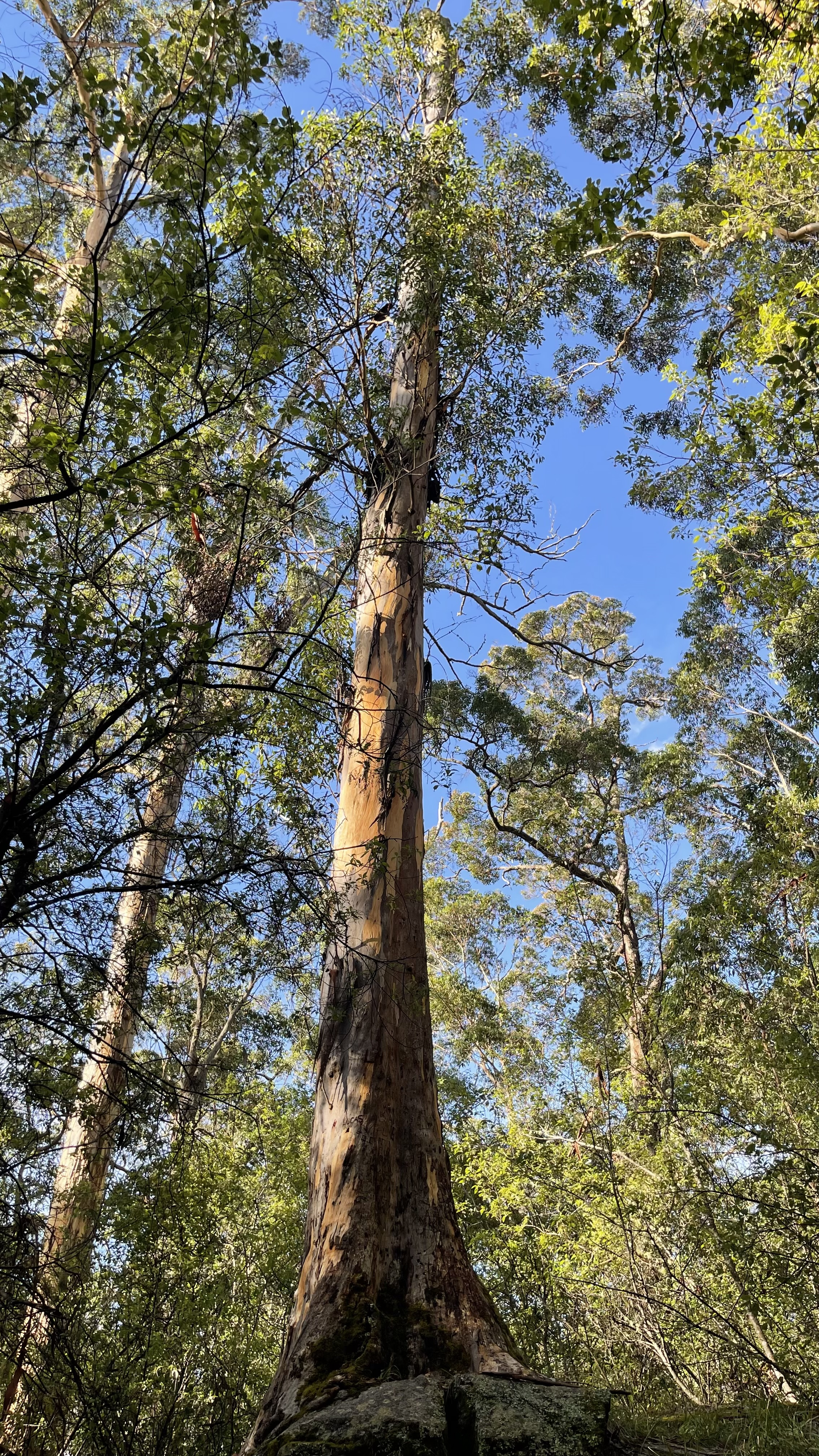
Tree in the Rock

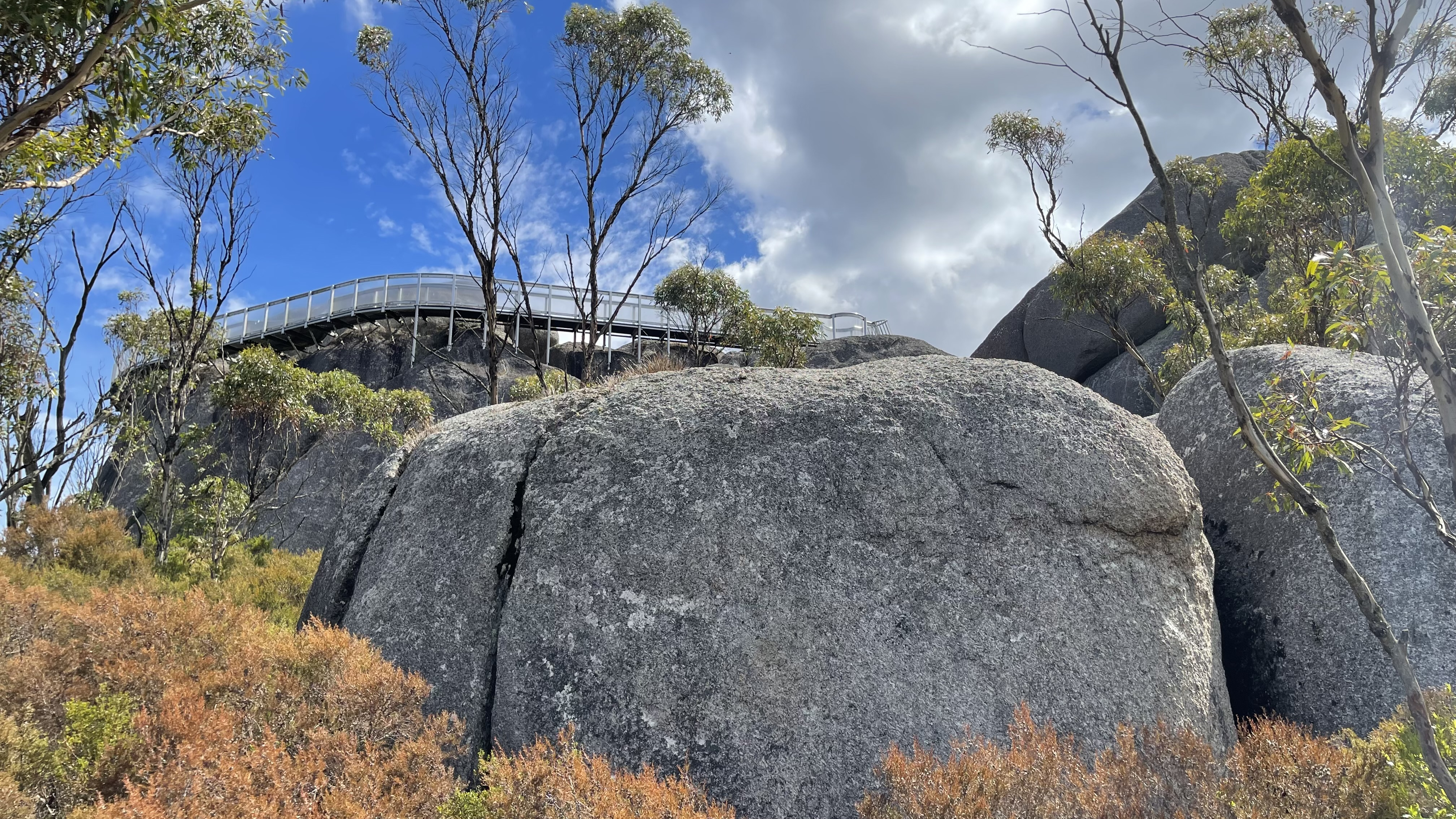
Castle Rock

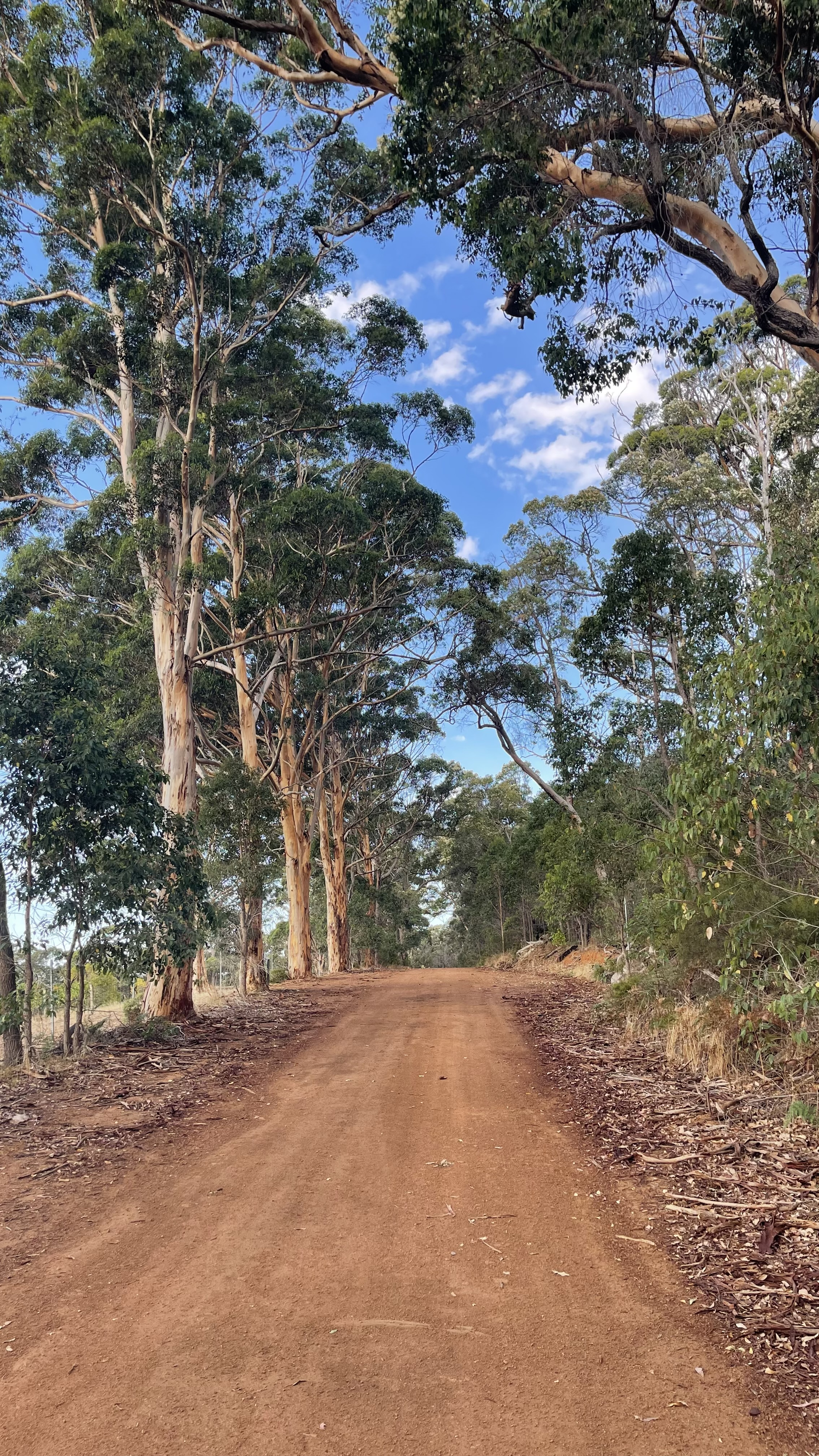
Road at very edge of park

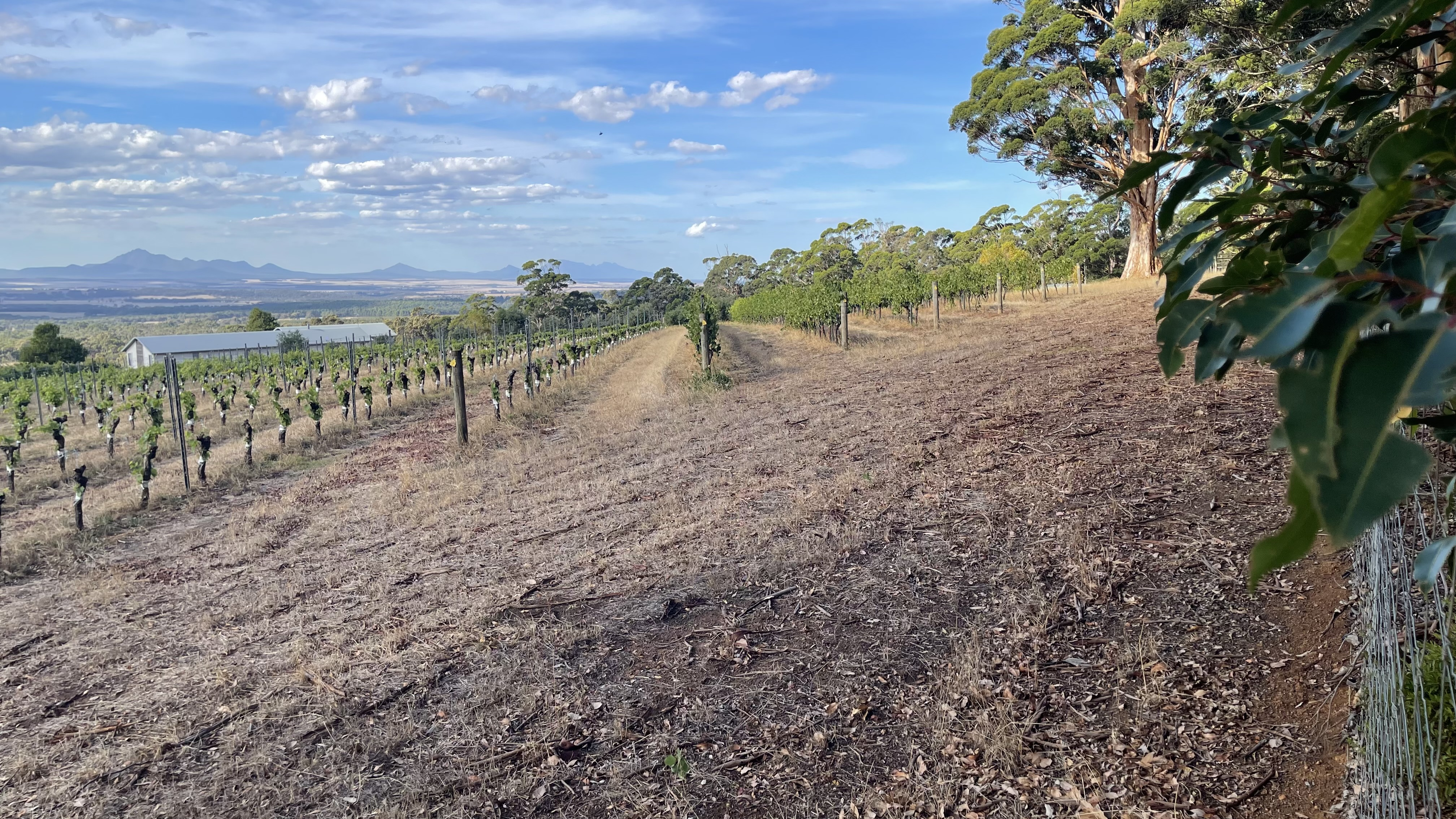
Vineyard abutting park, Stirling Range National Park in distance

== See also ==
- List of protected areas of Western Australia
- Porongurup, Western Australia
