= West Cape Howe (disambiguation) =

West Cape Howe may refer to:

- West Cape Howe, a headland in Western Australia
- West Cape Howe National Park, a national park Western Australia located on the headland
- West Cape Howe, Western Australia, a locality of the City of Albany, located on the headland
