= Youngs Siding, Western Australia =

Town in the City of Albany, Western Australia

Youngs Siding
- Town
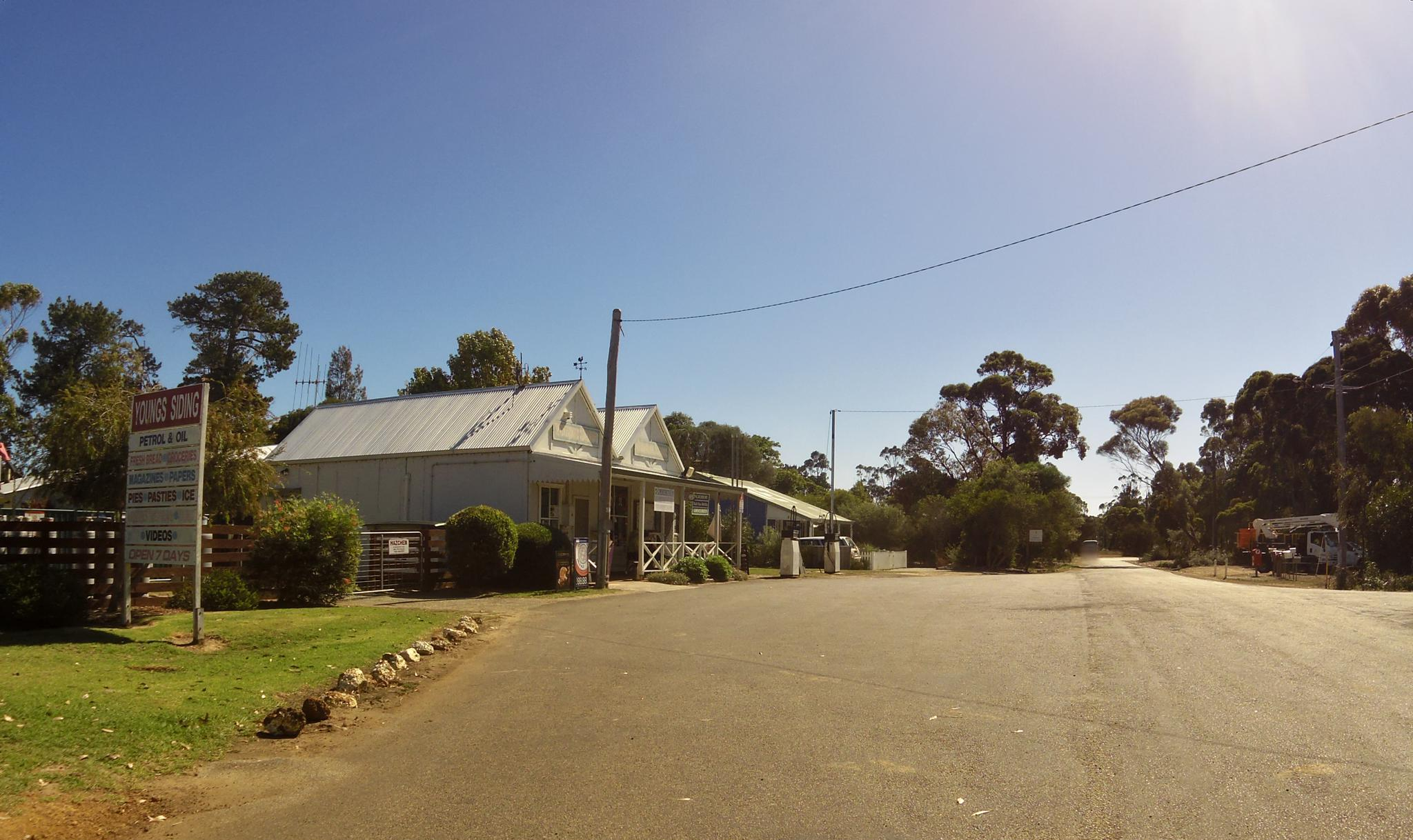
- Petrol station at Youngs Siding

- Coordinates: 35.01171°S 117.52193°E
- Country: Australia
- State: Western Australia
- LGA: City of Albany
- Location: 374 km (232 mi) SE of Perth; 17 km (11 mi) E of Denmark; 33 km (21 mi) W of Albany
- Established: 1917

Government
  - State electorate: Albany
  - Federal division: O'Connor

Area
  - Total: 116 km^{2} (45 sq mi)

Population
  - Total: 314 (SAL 2021)
- Postcode: 6330
Localities around Youngs Siding
Hay	Redmond West	Torbay
Hay	Youngs Siding	Kronkup
Nullaki	Lowlands	Bornholm

Youngs Siding is a town and locality of the City of Albany in the Great Southern region of Western Australia. It borders the Wilson Inlet to the west and the South Coast Highway runs through the locality west to east.

== History ==
Youngs Siding is on the traditional land of the Minang people of the Noongar nation.

Youngs Siding was established as a railway siding on the Torbay Junction to Torbay railway line, which opened in 1889, a line that was eventually extended further west to Denmark and Nornalup.

The state government set aside land for a townsite at Youngs Siding in 1903, but the land was not surveyed until 1916 and the town was gazetted the following year. The new town was named just Youngs, with the siding dropped from the name, but Youngs Siding remained in use locally and was eventually restored as the proper name in 1999. The name Youngs results from a local farmer, David Young, who took up land in the area in the 1850s and died in 1918. Young, who farmed at Marbelup, east of Youngs Siding, had come to Australia from England at the age of nine. He hosted Prince Albert and the future George V at his homestead, Marbelup Cottage near the shore of Wilson Inlet, in 1881 when they came to Western Australia as midshipmen on HMS Bacchante, and took them on excursions in the area.

The heritage listed Young's Siding Hall is located at the townsite and was officially opened on 14 April 1923, one of a number of community halls build in the area before and after the First World War.
