= West Cape Howe, Western Australia =

Locality in the City of Albany, Western Australia

West Cape Howe
- other
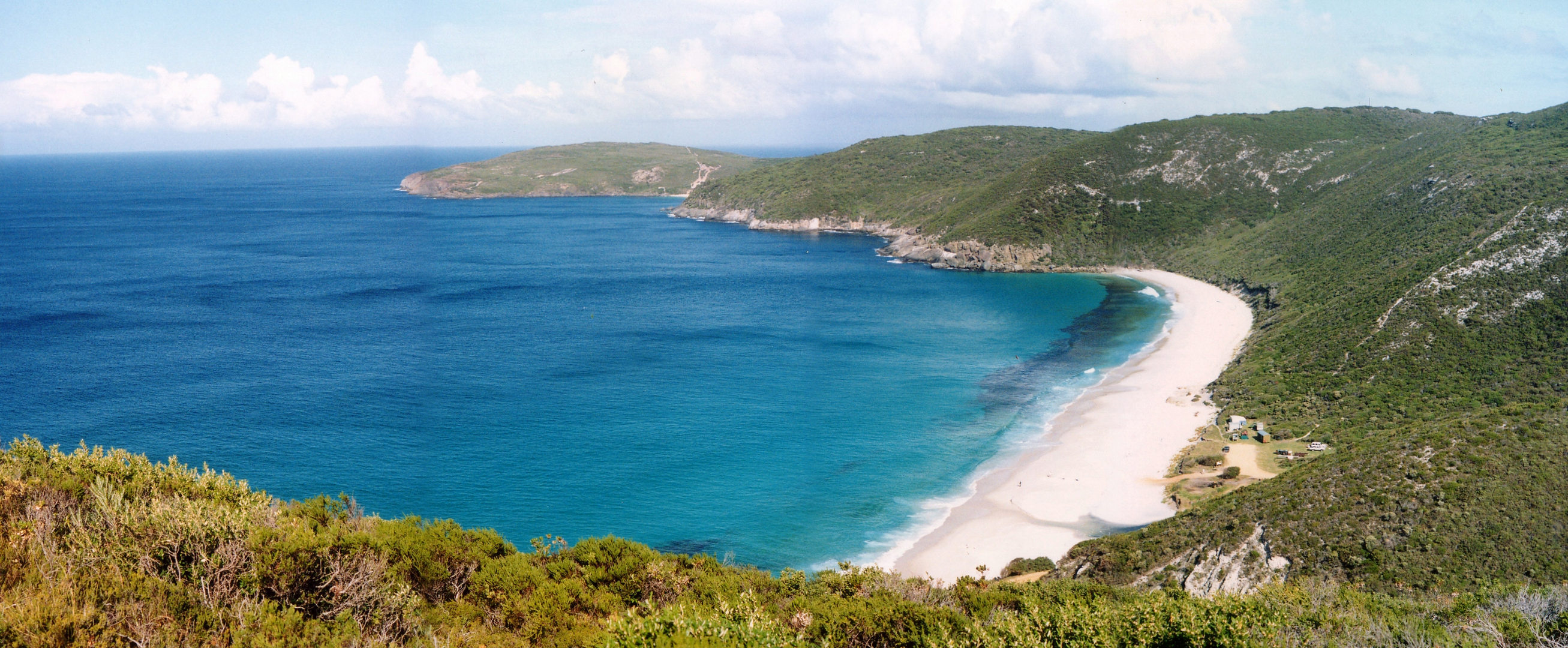
- Looking across Shelley Beach to Torbay Head

- Coordinates: 35.10221°S 117.61279°E
- Country: Australia
- State: Western Australia
- LGA: City of Albany
- Location: 387 km (240 mi) SE of Perth; 26 km (16 mi) SE of Denmark; 29 km (18 mi) W of Albany

Government
  - State electorate: Albany
  - Federal division: O'Connor

Area
  - Total: 24.9 km^{2} (9.6 sq mi)

Population
  - Total: 5 (SAL 2021)
- Postcode: 6330
Localities around West Cape Howe
Bornholm	Kronkup
Southern Ocean	West Cape Howe	Southern Ocean
	Southern Ocean

West Cape Howe is a locality of the City of Albany in the Great Southern region of Western Australia. The locality of West Cape Howe is on a headland, the West Cape Howe, and surrounded on three sides by the Southern Ocean. It is entirely covered by the West Cape Howe National Park, which also extends into the neighbouring Bornholm and Kronkup. Torbay Head, located within West Cape Howe, is the southernmost point in Western Australia.

West Cape Howe is on the traditional land of the Minang people of the Noongar nation.
