= Great capes =

Three major capes of the traditional clipper route

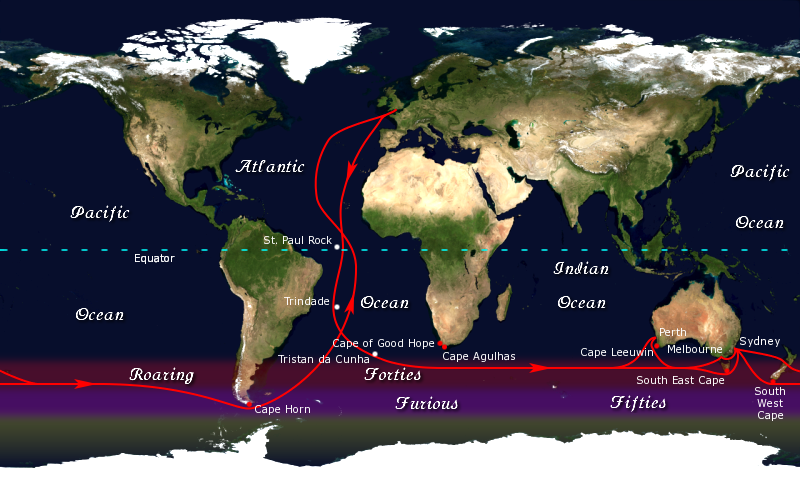
The clipper route from the United Kingdom to Australia and New Zealand, by way of the great capes

In sailing, the great capes are three major capes of the continents in the Southern Ocean: Africa's Cape of Good Hope, Australia's Cape Leeuwin, and South America's Cape Horn.

== Sailing ==
The great capes became landmarks in ocean voyaging due to the hazards they presented to shipping. The traditional clipper route followed the winds of the Roaring Forties south of the great capes.

Today, the great capes feature prominently in ocean yacht racing; many races and individual sailors follow the clipper route. A circumnavigation via the great capes is considered a noteworthy achievement. Joshua Slocum followed the route during the first solo circumnavigation of the world in 1895–1898 (though he didn't round Cape Horn, instead going through the Strait of Magellan); the Joshua Slocum Society International presented its Level 3 Golden Circle Award to later sailors who did the same. Krystyna Chojnowska-Liskiewicz of Poland followed the route when she became the first woman to sail solo around the world, embarking on her journey from the Canary Islands on March 28, 1976, and returning on April 21, 1978. Her 401-day circumnavigation covered 31,166 nautical miles (57,719 km).

In his book The Long Way, Bernard Moitessier wrote:

A sailor's geography is not always that of the cartographer, for whom a cape is a cape, with a latitude and longitude. For the sailor, a great cape is both a very simple and an extremely complicated whole of rocks, currents, breaking seas and huge waves, fair winds and gales, joys and fears, fatigue, dreams, painful hands, empty stomachs, wonderful moments, and suffering at times. A great cape, for us, can't be expressed in longitude and latitude alone. A great cape has a soul, with very soft, very violent shadows and colours. A soul as smooth as a child's, as hard as a criminal's. And that is why we go.

== Five southernmost capes ==
The five southernmost capes refer to the five geographically southern mainland (or large island) points on the Earth.

Sailors circumnavigating the world have used these five southernmost capes as goals on their route.

Cape	Location	Coordinates	Notes
Cape Horn	Chile	55°58′45″S 067°16′30″W	Hornos Island; Southernmost point in the Tierra del Fuego islands of South America and the official dividing point between the Atlantic and Pacific oceans. Roughly 2 degrees of latitude farther south than Chile's Cape Froward, the southernmost point on the mainland of South America, in the Strait of Magellan.
Cape Agulhas	South Africa	34°50′00″S 20°00′00″E	From Portuguese Cabo das Agulhas, for "Cape of Needles"; Southernmost point of Africa and the official dividing point between the Atlantic and Indian oceans. Roughly 29 minutes of latitude farther south than the more commonly cited Cape of Good Hope.
West Cape Howe	Australia	35°8′0″S 117°38′15″E	Contains three "heads", with the easternmost Torbay Head being the southernmost point of the mainland of Western Australia. Roughly 46 minutes of latitude farther south than the more commonly cited Cape Leeuwin.
South East Cape	Australia	43°38′30″S 146°49′45″E	Southernmost point of the main island of Tasmania and the official dividing point between the Pacific and Indian oceans. Roughly 4° 30′ farther south than South Point on the Wilsons Promontory peninsula in Victoria. South Point, Victoria is the most southern mainland point of Australia, on the north side of the Bass Strait separating Tasmania from the southeast Australian mainland
South Cape / Whiore	New Zealand	47°17′15″S 167°32′15″E	Southernmost point of Stewart Island / Rakiura and the southernmost point of the main islands of New Zealand. Roughly 37 minutes of latitude farther south than Slope Point, the southernmost point of the South Island.
