= Lowlands, Western Australia =

Locality in the City of Albany, Western Australia

Lowlands
- other
- Coordinates: 35.06118°S 117.50221°E
- Country: Australia
- State: Western Australia
- LGA(s): City of Albany
- Location: 378 km (235 mi) SE of Perth; 19 km (12 mi) E of Denmark; 33 km (21 mi) W of Albany

Government
  - State electorate(s): Albany
  - Federal division(s): O'Connor

Area
  - Total: 39.8 km^{2} (15.4 sq mi)

Population
  - Total(s): 149 (SAL 2021)
- Postcode: 6330
Localities around Lowlands
Nullaki	Youngs Siding	Bornholm
Nullaki	Lowlands	Bornholm
	Southern Ocean

Lowlands is a locality of the City of Albany in the Great Southern region of Western Australia, located along the Southern Ocean. It is located west of the West Cape Howe National Park, and south east of Wilson Inlet.

It is on the traditional land of the Minang people of the Noongar nation.
