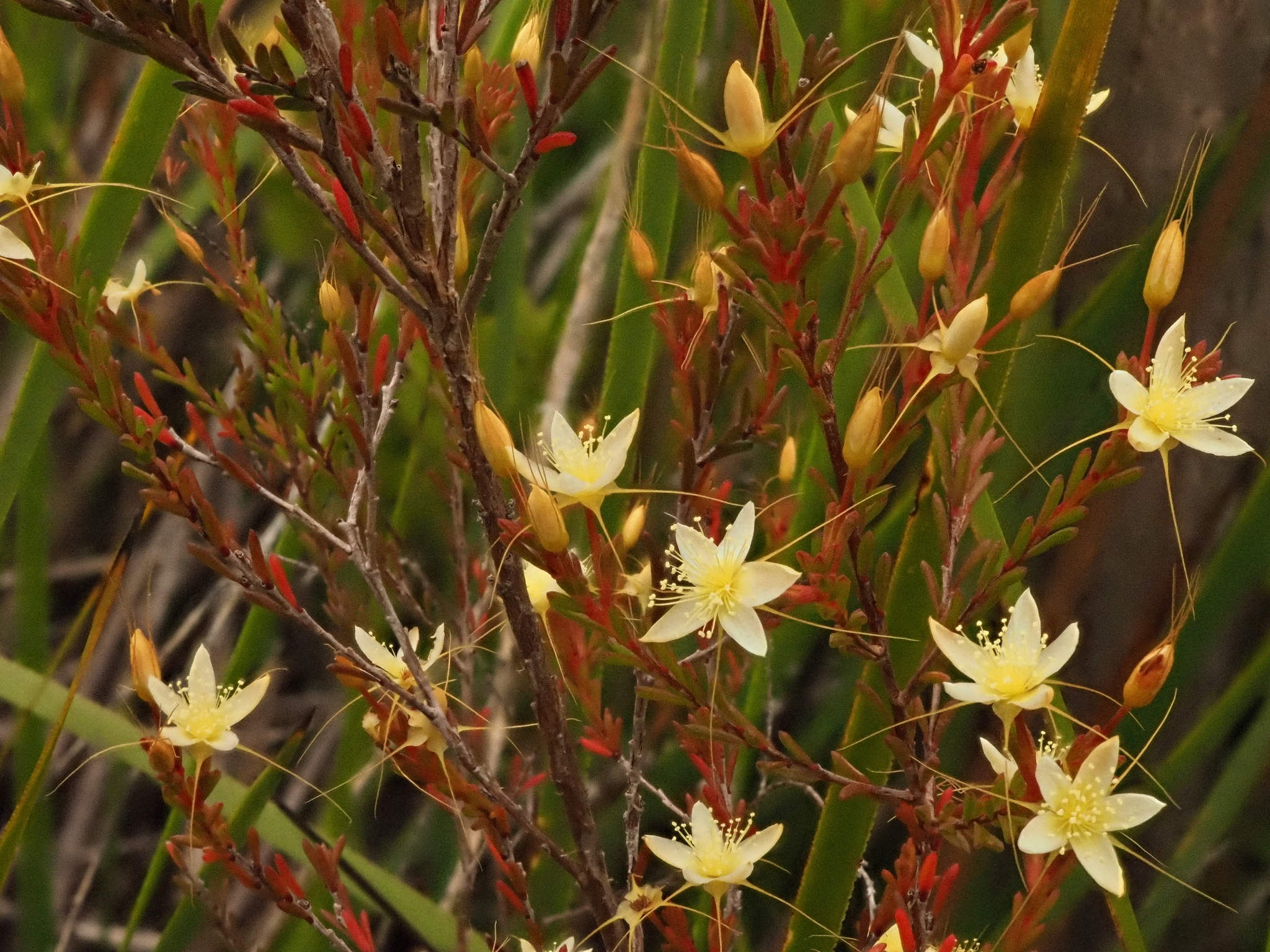
- Near King River

Scientific classification
- Kingdom: Plantae
- Clade: Tracheophytes
- Clade: Angiosperms
- Clade: Eudicots
- Clade: Rosids
- Order: Myrtales
- Family: Myrtaceae
- Genus: Calytrix
- Species: C. asperula

Binomial name
- Calytrix asperula (Schauer) Benth.

= Calytrix asperula =

Species of flowering plant

Calytrix asperula, commonly known as brush starflower, is a species of flowering plant in the myrtle family Myrtaceae and is endemic to the south of Western Australia. It is a mostly glabrous shrub with linear to narrowly elliptic leaves and cream-coloured to yellow flowers with 40 to 60 yellow stamens in several rows.

== Description ==
Calytrix asperula is a mostly glabrous shrub that typically grows to a height of 20–70 cm (7.9–27.6 in). Its leaves are linear to narrowly elliptic, 1.75–6.5 mm (0.069–0.256 in) long and 0.5–1.0 mm (0.020–0.039 in) wide on a petiole 0.3–1 mm (0.012–0.039 in) long. There are stipules up to 0.25 mm (0.0098 in) long at the base of the petioles. Each flower is on a peduncle 0.6–2.5 mm (0.024–0.098 in) long with narrowly elliptic to spoon shaped bracteoles 2–5 mm (0.079–0.197 in) long. The floral tube has 5 to 10 ribs and is fused to the style. The sepals are broadly elliptic to broadly egg-shaped with the narrower end towards the base, 1.5–2.5 mm (0.059–0.098 in) long and wide with an awn up to 15 mm (0.59 in) long. The petals are cream-coloured to yellow, 5–7 mm (0.20–0.28 in) long and 2.5–3.5 mm (0.098–0.138 in) wide and there are 40 to 60 stamens in several rows. Flowering mainly occurs from November to January.

== Taxonomy ==
This species was first formally described in 1844 by Johannes Conrad Schauer who gave it the name Calyothrix asperula in Lehmann's Plantae Preissianae. In 1867, George Bentham transferred the species to Calytrix as C. asperula in his Flora Australiensis. The specific epithet (asperula) means 'somewhat rough', referring to the leaves and bracteoles.

== Distribution and habitat ==
Brush starflower grows in heathy scrub on sand and on flats and granite outcrops and is found between the Denmark River, Bremer Bay and the Narembeen district in the Avon Wheatbelt, Esperance Plains, Jarrah Forest and Warren bioregions of southern Western Australia.
