= Nullaki, Western Australia =

Locality in the City of Albany, Western Australia

Nullaki
- other
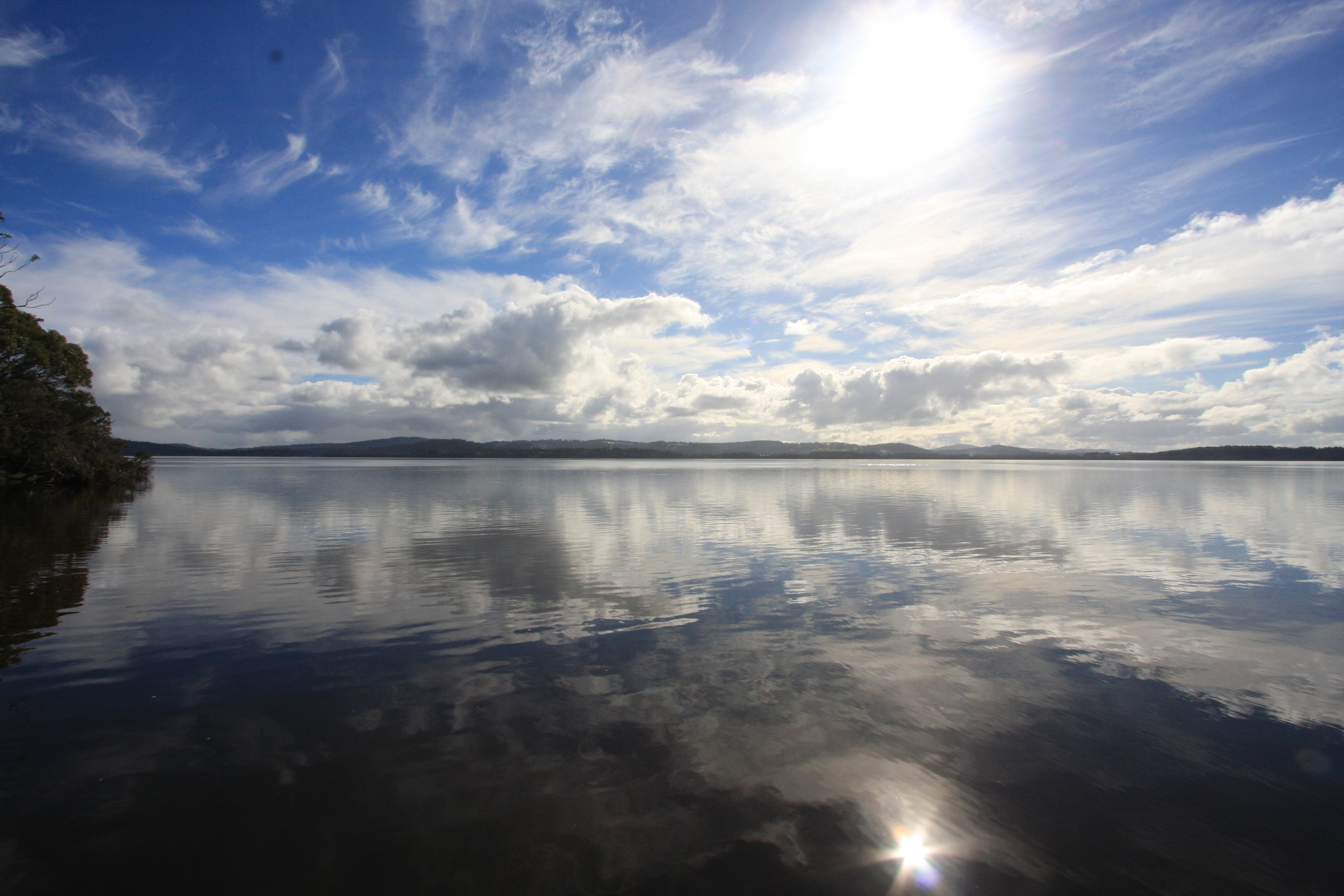
- The southern shore of the Wilson Inlet on the Nullaki Peninsula

- Coordinates: 35.02624°S 117.40919°E
- Country: Australia
- State: Western Australia
- LGA: City of Albany
- Location: 369 km (229 mi) SE of Perth; 7 km (4.3 mi) SE of Denmark; 45 km (28 mi) W of Albany

Government
  - State electorate: Albany
  - Federal division: O'Connor

Area
  - Total: 30.1 km^{2} (11.6 sq mi)

Population
  - Total: 32 (SAL 2021)
- Postcode: 6330
Localities around Nullaki
Denmark	Hay	Hay
Ocean Beach	Nullaki	Youngs Siding
	Southern Ocean	Lowlands

Nullaki is a locality of the City of Albany in the Great Southern region of Western Australia. It is located on a peninsula, between the Southern Ocean in the south and the Wilson Inlet to the north, with the latter intermittently connecting to the former west of Nullaki Point.

Nullaki is on the traditional land of the Minang people of the Noongar nation.

In February 1935, a townsite was gazetted at Nullaki Point, but no townsite or housing now exists at that location.
