= Native fuchsia =

Native fuchsia is a common name for several plants and may refer to:

- Correa reflexa, endemic to Australia
- Epacris longiflora, endemic to Eastern Australia
- Eremophila maculata, endemic to Australia
- Grevillea wilsonii, endemic to Western Australia
