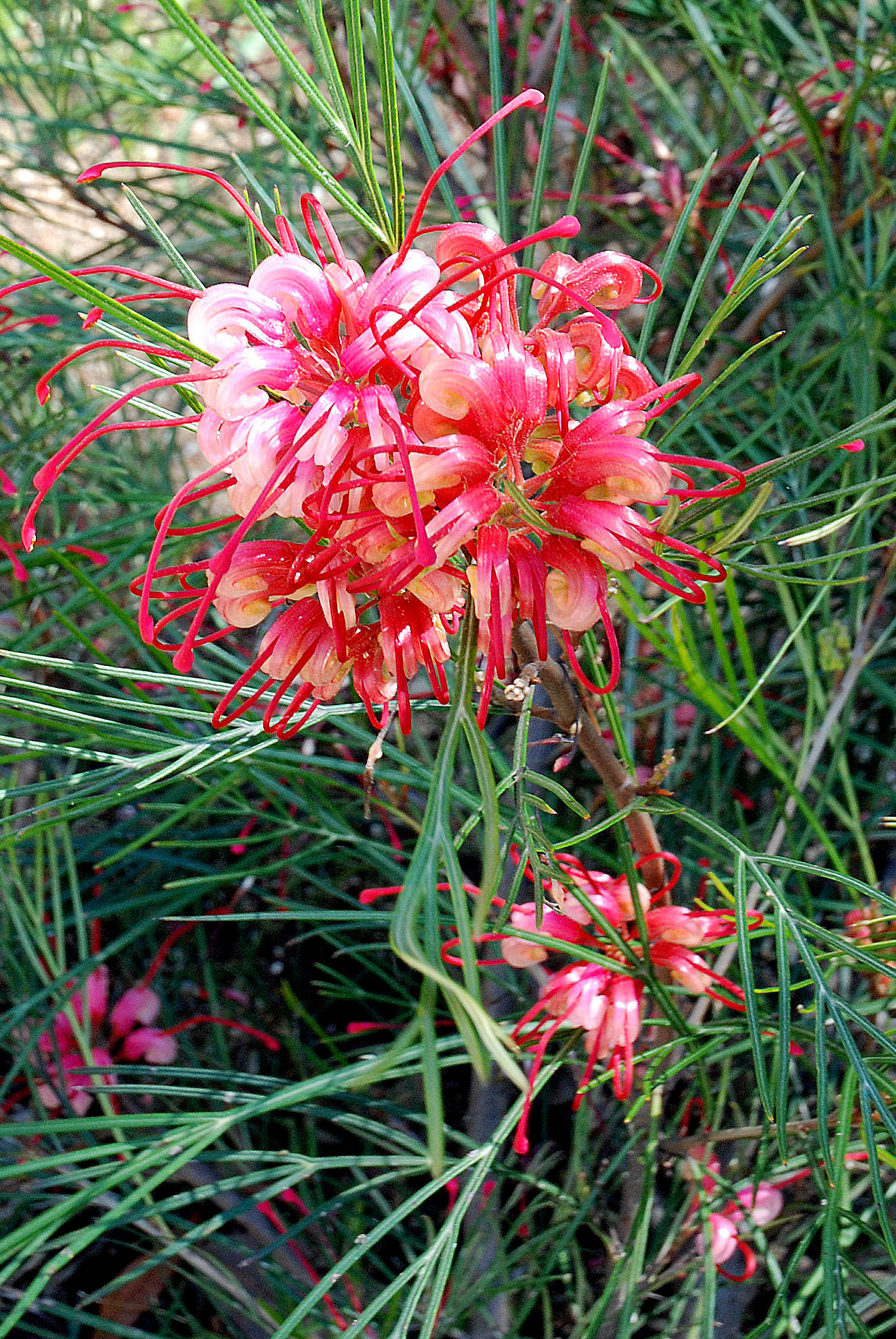

Conservation status
- Near Threatened (IUCN 3.1)

Scientific classification
- Kingdom: Plantae
- Clade: Embryophytes
- Clade: Tracheophytes
- Clade: Angiosperms
- Clade: Eudicots
- Order: Proteales
- Family: Proteaceae
- Genus: Grevillea
- Species: G. johnsonii

Binomial name
- Grevillea johnsonii McGill.

= Grevillea johnsonii =

Species of shrub endemic to New South Wales, Australia

Grevillea johnsonii, commonly known as Johnson's grevillea or Johnson's spider flower, is a species of flowering plant in the family Proteaceae and is endemic to New South Wales. It is a shrub with divided, needle-like leaves and red to orange flowers, and grows in rocky places.

== Description ==
Grevillea johnsonii is a shrub that typically grows to a height of 2–4.5 m (7–15 ft) and has divided, almost pinnatisect leaves 100–250 mm (4–10 in) long in outline. The leaves have between five and ten, erect, linear lobes 0.7–1.5 mm (0.03–0.06 in) wide. The flowers are arranged in groups of between eight and ten flowers, 30–80 mm (1.2–3.1 in) long with a silky, red to orange perianth with soft hairs near the base. The gynoecium is 25–37 mm (1.0–1.5 in) long with a conspicuous, stalked, more or less spherical ovary. The style is red to orange with an oblique pollen presenter. Flowering occurs from September to November and the fruit is a hairy, more or less spherical follicle 10 mm (0.4 in) in diameter containing one or two seeds. The shrub species typically regenerates from soil stored seed.

== Taxonomy and naming ==
Grevillea johnsonii was first formally described in 1975 by Donald McGillivray in the journal Telopea from specimens collected by Lawrie Johnson near Kerrabee Mountain and the Sandy Hollow–Gulgong railway line. The specific epithet (johnsonii) honours the collector of the type material, "whose perceptive insights into the Australian flora have added considerably to our understanding of many plant families". The genus Grevillea was named after Charles Francis Greville, a patron of botany and President of the Royal Society. Johnson was a taxonomic botanist, Director of the Royal Botanic Garden, Sydney and also specialised in the family Proteaceae, to which Grevillea johnsonii belongs. Common names for this species include Johnson's grevillea and Johnson's spider flower.

== Distribution and habitat ==
Grevillea johnsonii is endemic to New South Wales where it grows in rocky places on sandstone. The National Herbarium of New South Wales gives its distribution as "chiefly in the Goulburn and Capertee River catchments with a record from the Brogo River not verified". The Australian Native Plants Society suggests that the "common garden red and cream form" occurs near the Brogo River, whereas the orange-flowered form "grows naturally in the Goulburn River catchment at Cox's Gap and several other close by areas". The species grows natively at an altitude of 400–700 m (1,300–2,300 ft), where the annual rainfall is 600–700 mm (24–28 in).

It is closely related to the G. longistyla. However, differences are evident through the colour of G. johnsonii, ranging from orange to pink in comparison to the orange and red of G. longistyla orange to red colours. Both species were initially listed as forms of G. longistyla, but have since been separated with a specific status.

== Ecology ==
Grevillea johnsonii is known to attract honeyeaters, but they do not negatively impact the growth and establishment of the shrub. The fungi Placoasterella baileyi and Seimatosporium grevilleae can cause leaf spot disease in this species.

== Conservation status ==
In 2001, the total population of G. johnsonii was estimated to be well over 1,000 plants. The ROTAP conservation rating of G. johnsonii is currently 2RCi, meaning the shrub species is rare, based on the low populations of G. johnsonii in the Goulburn River area. This indicates that the species is inadequately reserved, with restricted distribution of less than 1000 over a range of 100km. Despite the current rating, collections of the species in recent years has resulted in a proposal to downgrade the ROTAP listing from 2RCi to 2RCa, indicating that the species is now adequately reserved with 1000 or more plants in a proclaimed reserve.

During the 2019–2020 bushfires in southern Australia, the Wildlife and Threatened Species Bushfire Recovery Expert Panel released a "Provisional list of plants requiring urgent management intervention", with Grevillea johnsonii being mentioned as high priority in its conservation and recovery. It emphasised that its "fire-disease interaction" and the "cumulative exposure to high risks" required conservation action to prevent possible extinction. However, many native plants, including G. johnsonii are capable of regenerating after fire from epicormic buds on the trunks and/or branches, from a basal lignotuber.

== Uses ==
=== Use in horticulture ===
Grevillea johnsonii was introduced into regular cultivation in the 1950s by Australian botanist George Althofer. The shrub species is regularly grown in Victoria in comparison to NSW, as the summer rain cannot sustain well drained soils during summer rains. If G. johnsonii is propagated outside, it is most suitable to use semi-hardwood cuttings and use acidic to neutral, well drained soil. It is important to propagate the shrub species in an area that does not maintain full sunlight exposure. If it is propagated inside, it should be grown under glass in full light, whereby liquid fertiliser must be provided monthly. Once established in the garden, the orange-flowered form tolerates a wide temperature range, including frost, and sets large numbers of seeds that germinate readily after soaking in smoked water. Grevillea 'Bon Accord', a hybrid formed by a cross between G. johnsonii and G. wilsonii has been developed. The broad leaves of Grevillea johnsonii are evergreen. This species is most suited to a sheltered location, however full sunlight also benefits the species. Soil conditions include well drained soil with the species commonly growing in loam or sand.

Grevillea johnsonii requires little to no pruning, however if it is propagated inside, more frequent pruning is necessary to restrict size. Foliage in autumn, winter and spring is primarily green, however summer will flower with red, pink, and orange forms.

Grevillea johnsonii sometimes does not produce a strong root ball and may require a rootstock to be propagated effectively. Other species of the Grevillea are useful, such as Grevillea robusta.

A notable hybrid of G. johnsonii is Grevillea 'Bon Accord', a hybrid between G. johnsonii and Grevillea wilsonii. The hybrid arose in Victoria in 1982, and was registered in 1985 with the Australian Cultivar Registration Authority.

=== Use in floristry ===
The vase life of G. johnsonii flowers is limited because the flowers fade and drop their petals rather quickly.
