= Hay River (Western Australia) =

River in Western Australia

Coordinates: 34°58′19″S 117°27′39″E

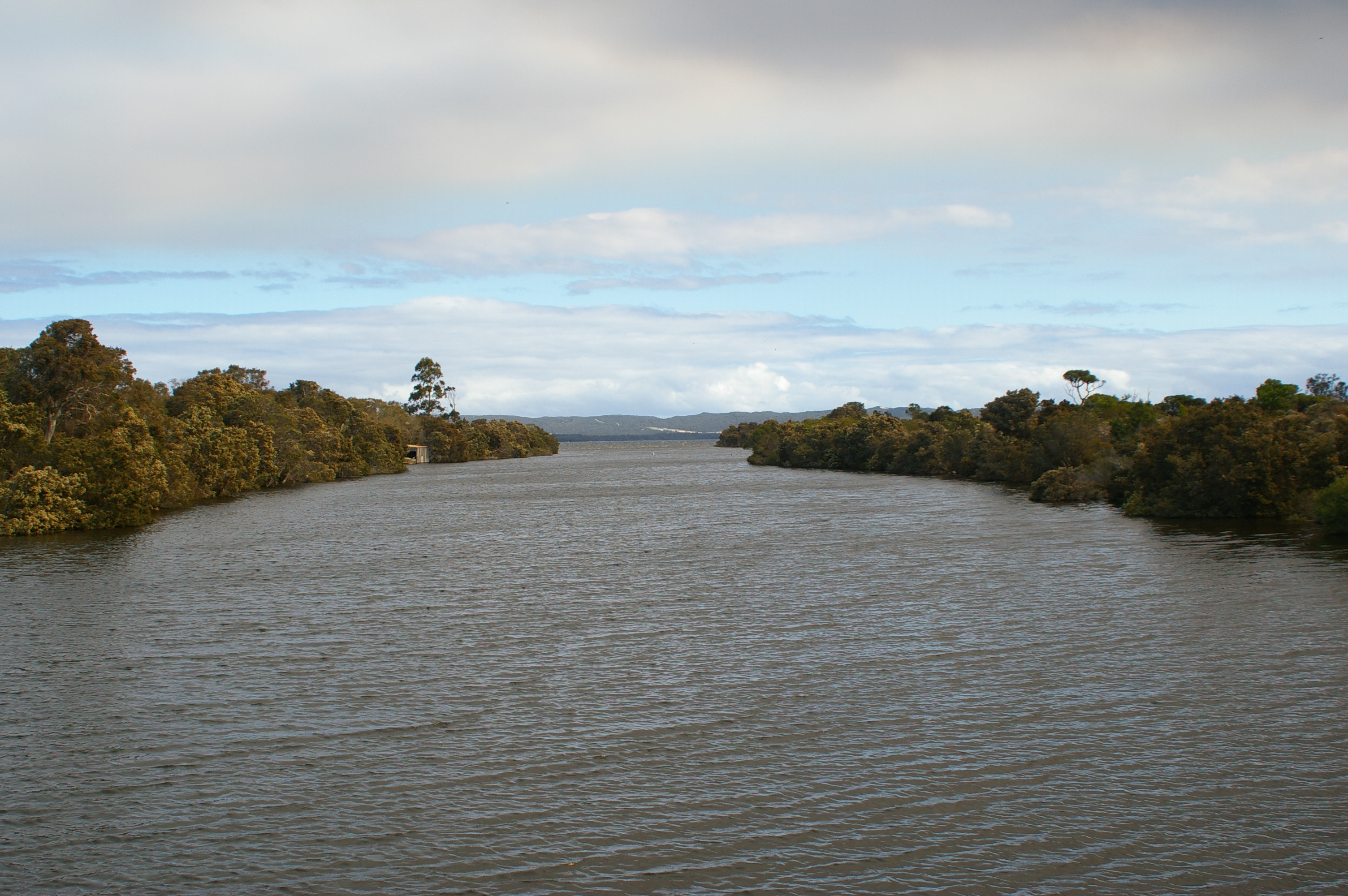
- Hay River flowing into Wilson Inlet

Location
- Country: Australia

Physical characteristics
- Source
  - location: West of Mount Barker
  - elevation: 225 metres (738 ft)
- Mouth
  - location: Wilson Inlet
  - elevation: sea level
- Length: 80 km (50 mi)
- Basin size: 129,800 hectares (320,743 acres)
- Discharge
  - average: 69,400 ML/a (2.20 m^{3}/s; 77.7 cu ft/s)

The Hay River is a river in the Great Southern region of Western Australia. The traditional owners of the area are the Noongar people, who know the river as Genulup.

The river was given its English name in December 1829 by naval ship's surgeon Thomas Braidwood Wilson after Sir Robert William Hay, Permanent Under-secretary of State for the Colonies from 1825 to 1836. Wilson saw the river while exploring the area in company with the Noongar man Mokare, John Kent (officer in charge of the Commissariat at King George Sound), two convicts and Private William Gough of the 39th Regiment, while his ship Governor Phillip was being repaired at King George Sound.

The Hay River is part of the Denmark catchment, which comprises Wilson Inlet, Torbay Inlet and Lake Powell, together with the catchments of the Denmark, Hay and Sleeman-Cuppup Rivers and their tributaries.

The river rises west of Mount Barker near Wilpuna Park and flows south east as far as Ungerup then flows in a south-south-westerly direction through the Mount Lindesay National Park then crosses the South Coast Highway and discharges into Wilson Inlet.

The tidal influence is 5 kilometres (3 mi) upstream from where the river flows into the inlet. The Hay River flows all year and the water quality is marginally saline to brackish. It is estimated that 70% of the catchment area has been cleared for agricultural purposes but 42% of the riparian zone was pristine.

Tributaries of the river include Sleeman Creek and Mitchell River.
