= Denmark River =

River in Western Australia

Coordinates: 34°57′42.99″S 117°21′40.88″E

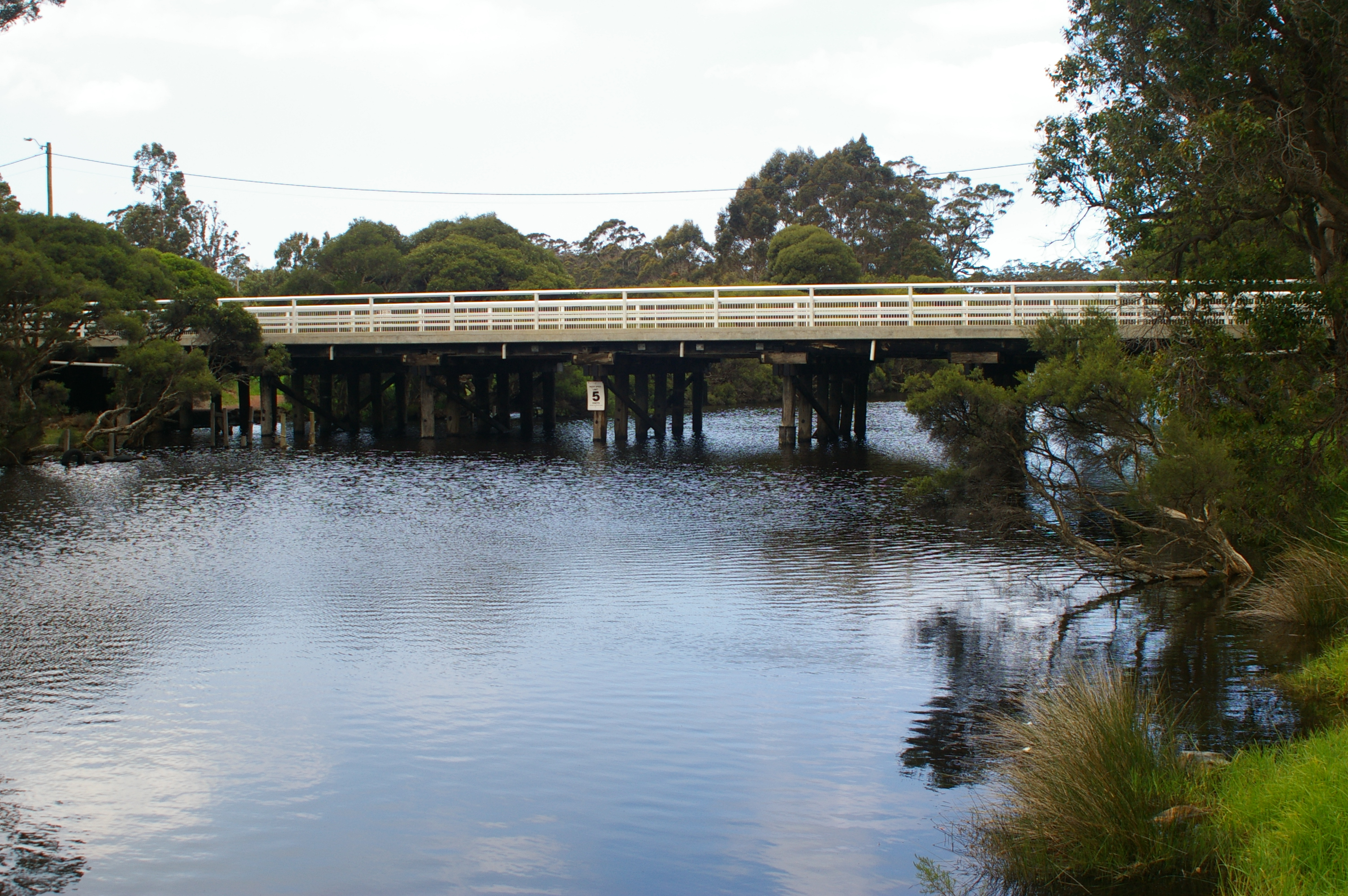
- Denmark River South Coast Highway Bridge Denmark

Location
- Country: Australia

Physical characteristics
- Source
  - location: near Pardelup
  - elevation: 160 metres (525 ft)
- Mouth
  - location: Wilson Inlet
- Length: 60 kilometres (37 mi)
- Basin size: 800 square kilometres (309 mi^{2})
- Discharge
  - average: 30,584 ML/a (1.0801×10^{9} cu ft/a)

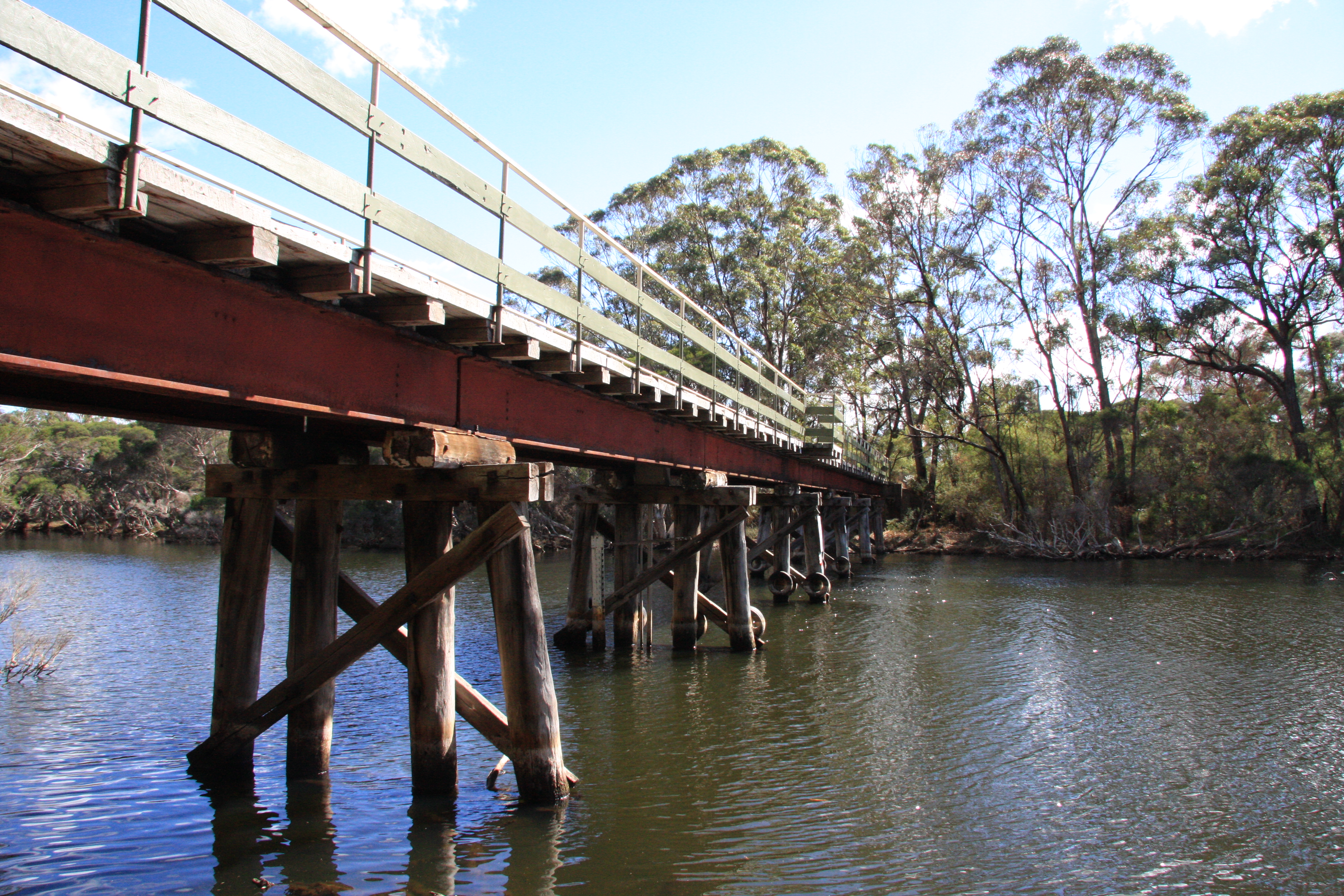
Heritage rail bridge over river

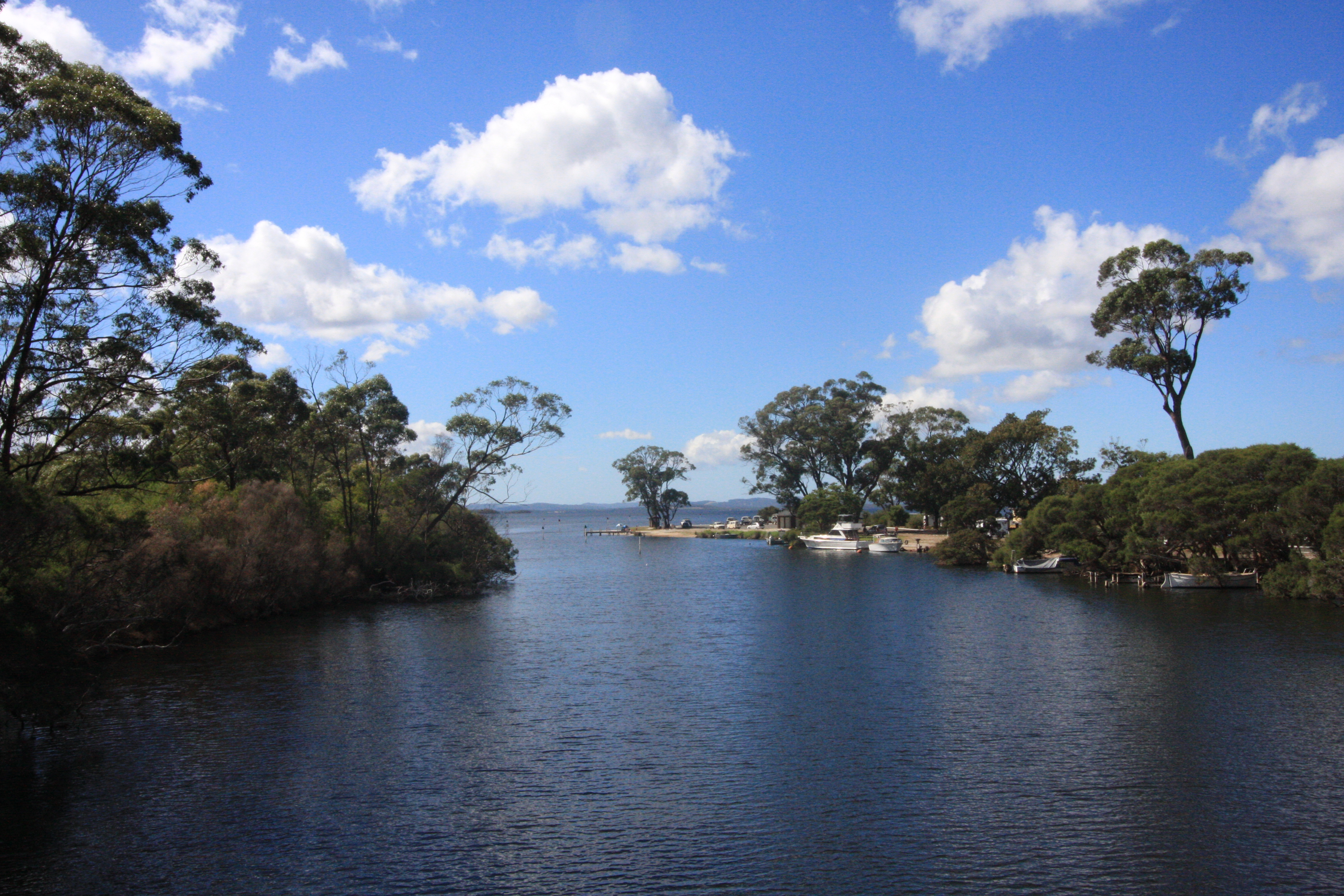
Denmark River flowing into the Wilson Inlet, taken from the Heritage Rail Bridge

The Denmark River is located in the Great Southern region of Western Australia. The river rises near Pardelup and meanders in a southerly direction until it flows through Denmark into Wilson Inlet (along with the Hay River). The traditional owners of the area are the Noongar people, who know the river as Kwoorabup, meaning the place of the western brush wallaby (place we return to).

The river was given its English name in December 1829 by naval ship's surgeon Thomas Braidwood Wilson after his mentor, naval surgeon Alexander Denmark, Physician of the Fleet, Resident Physician at the Royal Hospital Haslar, and past-Physician to the Mediterranean Fleet. Wilson found the river while exploring the area in company of the native Mokare, John Kent (officer in charge of the Commissariat at King George Sound), two convicts and Private William Gough of the 39th Regiment, while his ship Governor Phillips was being repaired at King George Sound.

A surveyor noted in 1833 that the local Aboriginal people, the Noongar, called the river "Koorrabup" meaning "place of the black swan".

The river flows through Denmark Pipehead Dam. The two tributaries of the river are Scotsdale Brook and Cleerillup Creek.

The southern portion of the river was protected under a management plan of the Shire of Denmark in 2011. The ceremonial site has been used by Noongar people for over 10,000 years as a place of dance, song, marriage preparation, initiation and food gathering. The area has high cultural significance due largely to its totemic significance and creation by the Wagyl in the Dreaming.

== Salinity ==
Historically the Denmark River's water quality declined as a result of land clearing in the catchment area since European settlement. It is estimated that 40% of the river's upper catchment area was cleared and as a result salinity levels increased from 40 mg/L in the 1940s to a peak of 1520 mg/L in 1987 at the Mt Lindesay gauging station.

In 2004 it was announced that salinity levels in the river were decreasing, believed to be the first major river in Australia that had shown a reversal in salinity trends, and that it is possible that the river could provide drinking quality water in the future.

By 2012 average annual salinity levels had dropped to 470 mg/L, below World Health Organization guidelines for drinking water for the first time in nearly 40 years. The improved water quality means Denmark Dam has been returned as a drinking water source and back-up water supply for Denmark.

The drop in salinity is mainly attributed to the revegetation of previously cleared farmland with Tasmanian blue gum plantations.
