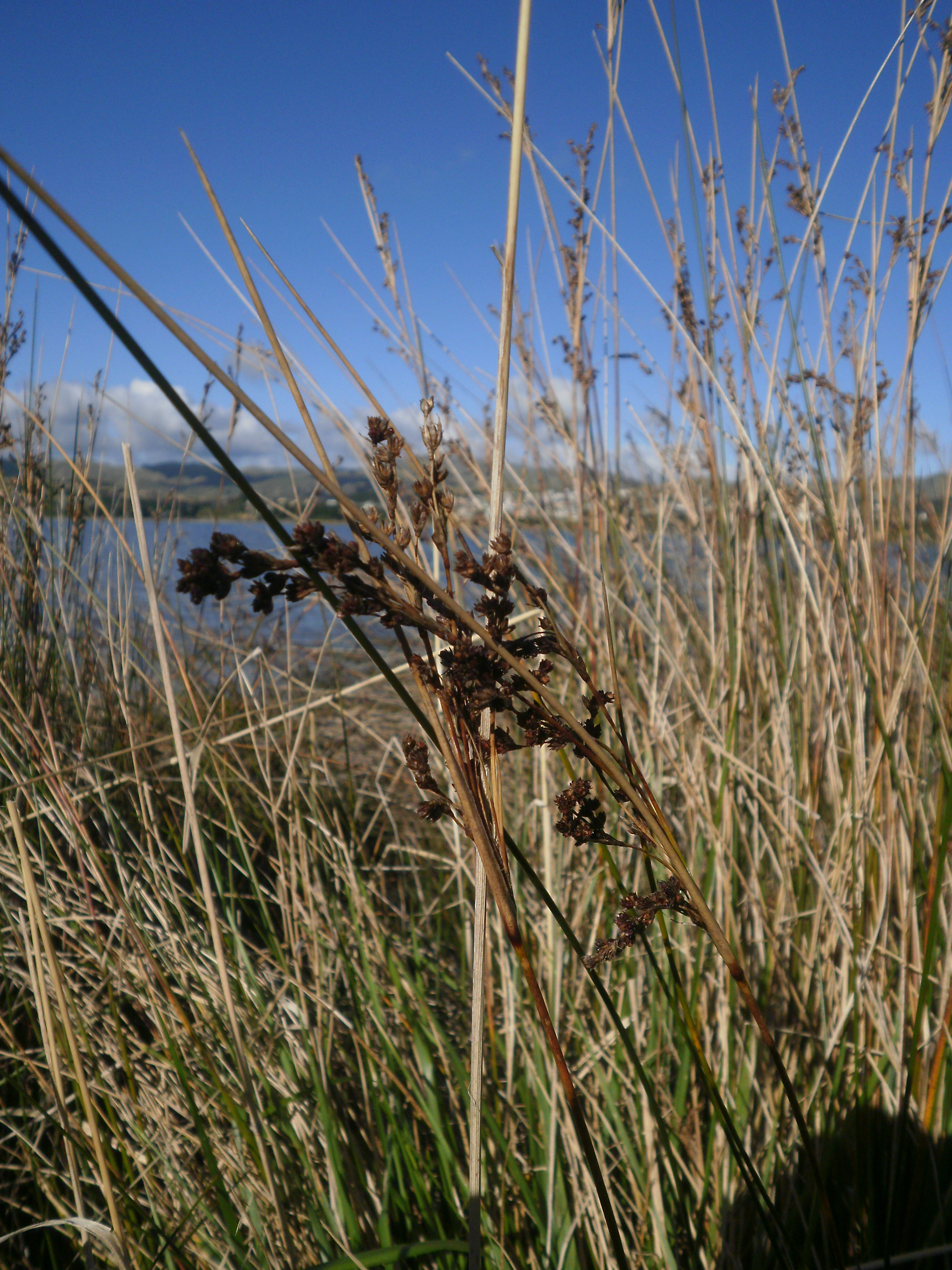
- Juncus kraussii subsp. australiensis

Scientific classification
- Kingdom: Plantae
- Clade: Tracheophytes
- Clade: Angiosperms
- Clade: Monocots
- Clade: Commelinids
- Order: Poales
- Family: Juncaceae
- Genus: Juncus
- Species: J. kraussii

Binomial name
- Juncus kraussii Hochst.

Subspecies
- Juncus kraussii subsp. austerus (Buchenau) Snogerup; Juncus kraussii subsp. australiensis (Buchenau) Snogerup; Juncus kraussii subsp. kraussii

= Juncus kraussii =

Species of grass

Juncus kraussii commonly known as salt marsh rush, sea rush, jointed rush, matting rush or dune slack rush, is of the monocot family Juncaceae and genus Juncus. It grows in salt marshes, estuarine and coastal areas.

This species is ideal as a stabiliser in estuary banks and riparian zones that adjoin developed areas; it prevents erosion and also provides an excellent fibre for weaving.

The plant is named after a German naturalist and museum curator, Christian Krauss, who travelled to South Africa.

== Description ==
This species is a tussock shaped perennial with many rhizomes.

The leaves are tough, straw shaped and spine-tipped that grow to be 40 centimetres (16 in) - 150 centimetres (59 in) in length with a golden brown or shiny black sheath. The inflorescences or flowers of J. kraussii are reddish brown to purplish brown in colour, 4 centimetres (1.6 in) - 20 centimetres (7.9 in) in length and are clustered toward the end of the stem. The flowers have clusters of three to six and flowering occurs in Summer between October and January.

== Distribution and habitat ==
The species occurs in all states of Australia, New Zealand Southern Africa and South America.

Juncus kraussii is salt tolerant and favours a damp environment and is most often found in areas such as swamps and brackish estuaries. The plant is able to grow in a range of soils from sands to alluvium.

== Uses ==
Juncus kraussii is harvested and weaved to produce traditional sleeping mats, baskets, beer strainers, and other craftwork items in many Zulu areas of South Africa. The plant is in great demand because of its economic value and has been extensively harvested in the wild. It is now cultivated in many areas and is harvested yearly for a period of seven years in total.

The stems and leaves of Juncus kraussii were used by Indigenous Australians for fibre, for string, fishing lines, woven rugs and woven baskets. It is commonly used today for stabilisation of the banks of estuaries, around salt marshes and riparian zones next to sites developed for human use. It is also used in biofiltration systems and rain gardens.
