= Wilson Inlet =

Inlet south of Denmark, Western Australia

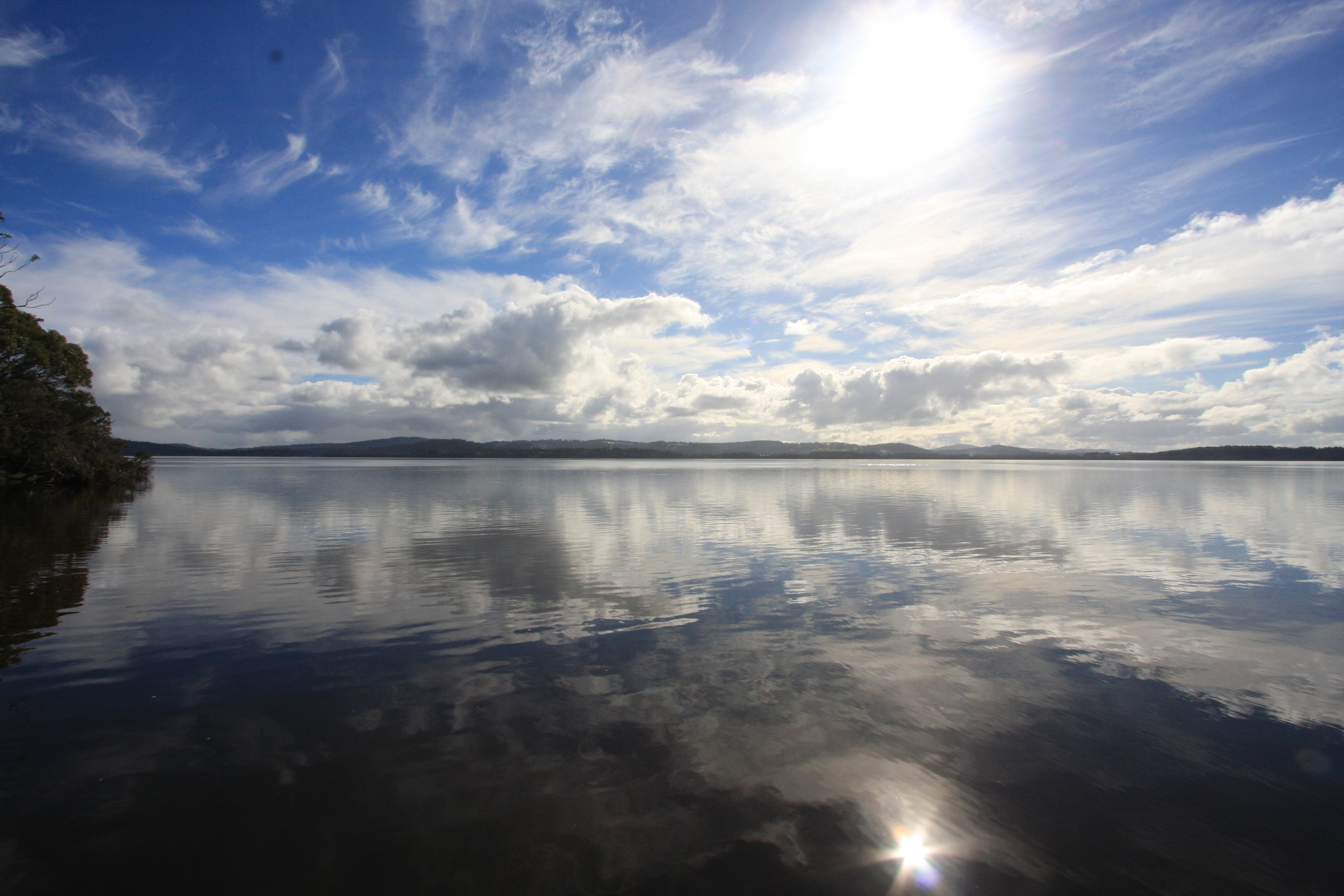
- Wilson Inlet from Nullaki Peninsula, facing north across the inlet towards Denmark

- Interactive map of Wilson Inlet
- Coordinates: 34°59′43″S 117°24′42″E
- Country: Australia
- State: Western Australia
- LGA: Shire of Denmark

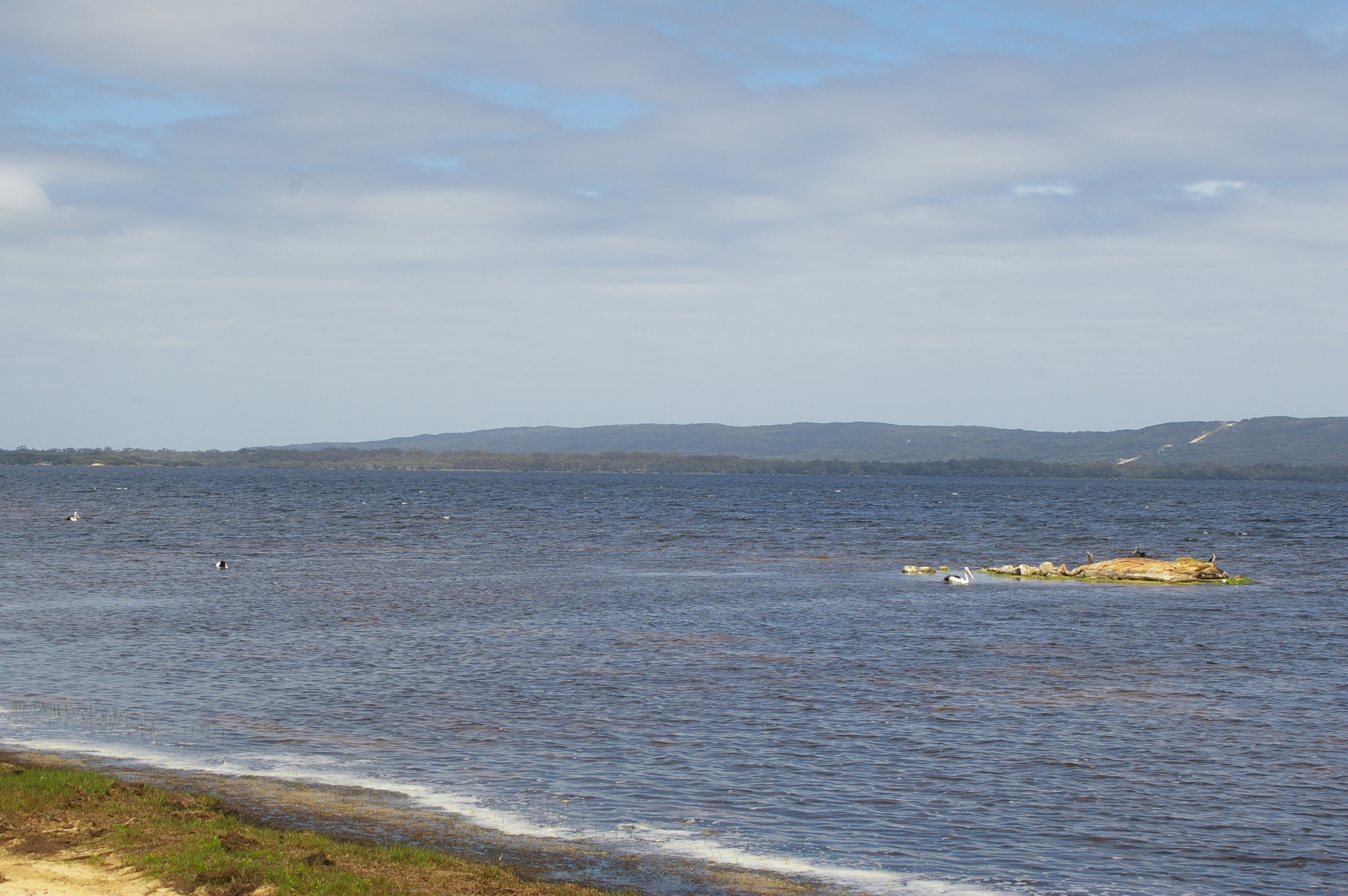
View from Crusoe Beach facing south across the inlet with granitic outcrop in the foreground

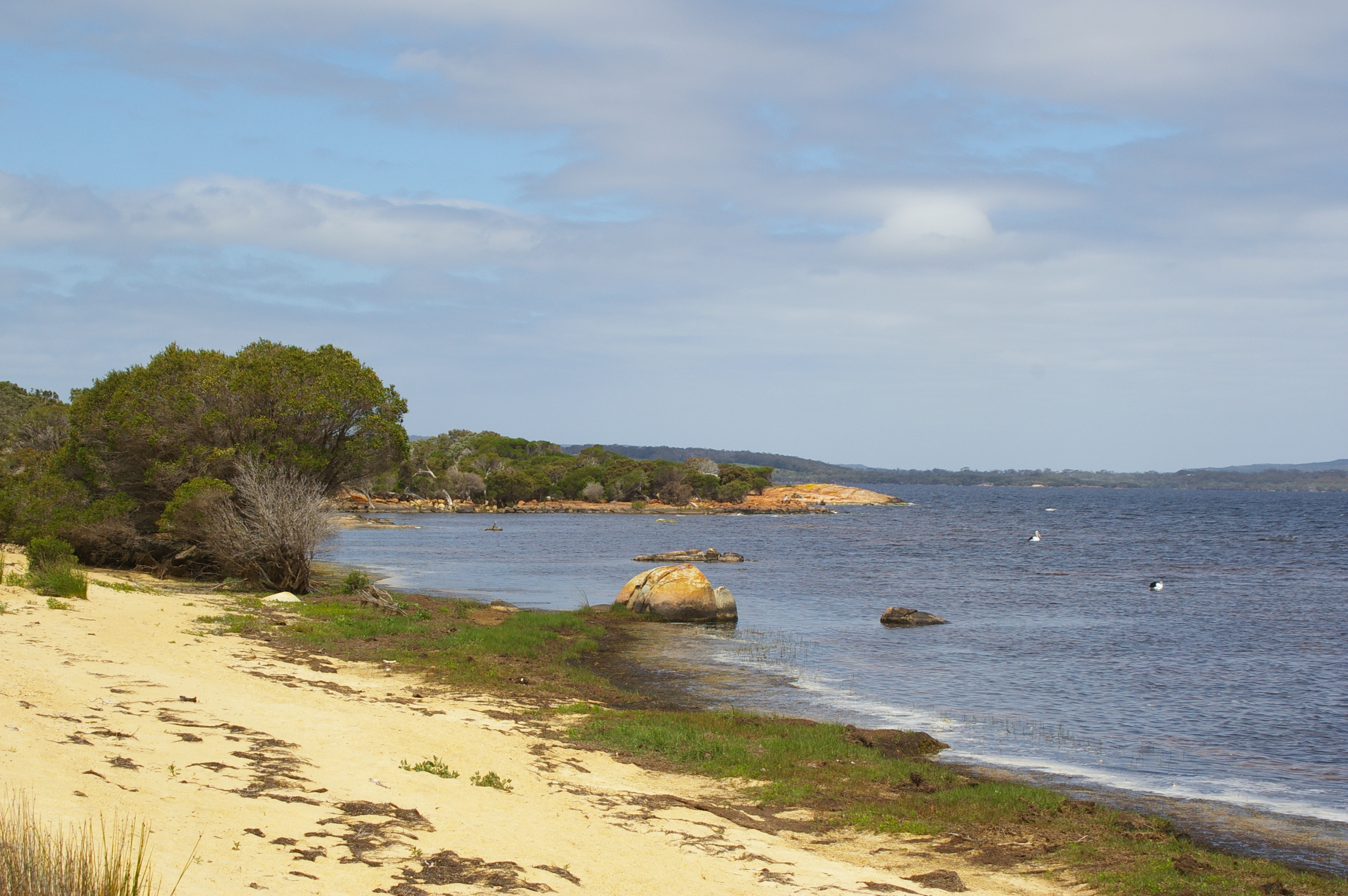
Wilson Inlet from Crusoe Beach on the north shore of the inlet, facing east

Wilson Inlet is a shallow, seasonally open estuary located on the coast of the Great Southern region of Western Australia.

== Description ==
The inlet receives water from the two main rivers: the Denmark River and the Hay River and some smaller rivers and streams such as the Sleeman River, Little River and Cuppup Creek. It is located 2 kilometres (1 mi) south east of the town of Denmark.

The inlet is a wave dominated estuary with an opening mouth that has a width of 100 metres (328 ft) with a bar blocking it from late January to August. The inlet is separated into two basins, the eastern and western basin.

The estuary is situated on a narrow coastal plain between granite hills to the north and the west and the coastal dunes to the south. The area of the inlet is 48 square kilometres (19 sq mi) and it has an average depth of 1.8 metres (6 ft); its deepest point is 5 metres (16 ft). The inlet is 14 kilometres (9 mi) long from east to west and has a width of 4 kilometres (2 mi)

The inlet has a total catchment area of 2,263 square kilometres (874 sq mi) covering parts of the Shire of Plantagenet, the Shire of Denmark and the City of Albany.

The inlet discharges through Nullaki Point at the eastern end of Ocean Beach into the Southern Ocean at Ratcliffe Bay when the sandbar is open. The Wilson Inlet bar is sometimes breached by the Water Corporation at Ocean Beach near Denmark. The low lying land adjacent to the inlet consists of swamps with lakes to the east. The silt beds in the area indicate that it was of recent estuarine origin. The majority of the catchment is contained within the Albany-Fraser geological province with the original granite overlaid with sands and laterite deposited in the Quaternary period.

== History ==
The inlet was formed 6000–8000 years ago when rising sea levels led to an ancient river valley being flooded. The original human inhabitants of the inlet and surrounds were Aboriginal Australian people, the Noongar. Many Aboriginal artefacts have been found in the area, including fish traps, corroboree sites, ochre excavation site and campsites.

The Noongar name for the inlet is Koorabup, which means Place of the Black Swan. The area was visited by Dr Thomas Wilson in his 1829 expedition from King George Sound. The inlet was named after Wilson by Governor Stirling.

The first Europeans to settle in the catchment area were the Randall and Young families in the 1890s. Timber mills were constructed in 1895, land clearing began in the 1920s, and by 1982 46% of the catchment was privately owned. In total 44% of the catchment has been cleared and 38% remains as forest and national parks.

In 1911 a local farmer William Leonard Smeed and six members of his family (four adults and three children), were drowned when their small yacht Little Wonder was knocked down in a squall while sailing on the inlet near Pelican Island.

The inlet is breached at Ocean Beach near Denmark at times to reduce the chances of flooding around the local river systems. The bar was breached in 2014, 2017, 2018 and again in 2020.

== Flora ==
The mouth of the inlet is dominated by stands of rushes (Juncaceae) of a single species, the South African Juncus kraussi. Melaleuca cuticularis, a salt tolerant paperbark, also fringes the inlet and follows the channels, and is present in the tidal parts of the rivers. The salt marsh is predominantly made up of Juncus kraussi, Sarcocornia quinqueflora, and Samolus repens.

== Fauna ==
Recreational fishing is popular within the inlet, which many species of fish inhabit, including cobbler, King George whiting, tailor, mullet, salmon trout and flathead. Other fish found in the estuary include sandy sprat, yellow eye mullet, sea mullet and blue mackerel.

Wilson Inlet is a key nursery for many juvenile fish species especially pink snapper that migrate from the inlet to mature in the greater oceanic breeding stock. Because of this the size of pink snapper that could be removed from the inlet was raised from 28 centimetres (11 in) to 41 centimetres (16 in) in July 2007.

Many waterbird species inhabit the inlet and its surrounds, including the silver gull, Australian pelican, black swan, little black cormorant, red-necked stint, little pied cormorant, grey teal, red-necked avocet, blue-billed duck and the Australasian shoveller. 22 species of migratory shorebird have been recorded.

The inlet is home to a mussel and oyster farm that was established in 2002. The farm operates on a 12-hectare (30-acre) lease on the south side of the inlet and completed its first harvest in 2005–2006. Blue mussels are produced using a longline cultivation technique. Belon oysters are cultivated using a similar technique. An earlier operation had attempted to commercially produce blue mussels in the 1970s, but the small scale raft culture was destroyed by Cyclone Alby just prior to harvest.
