= West Cape Howe National Park =

National park in Western Australia

- IUCN category II (national park)
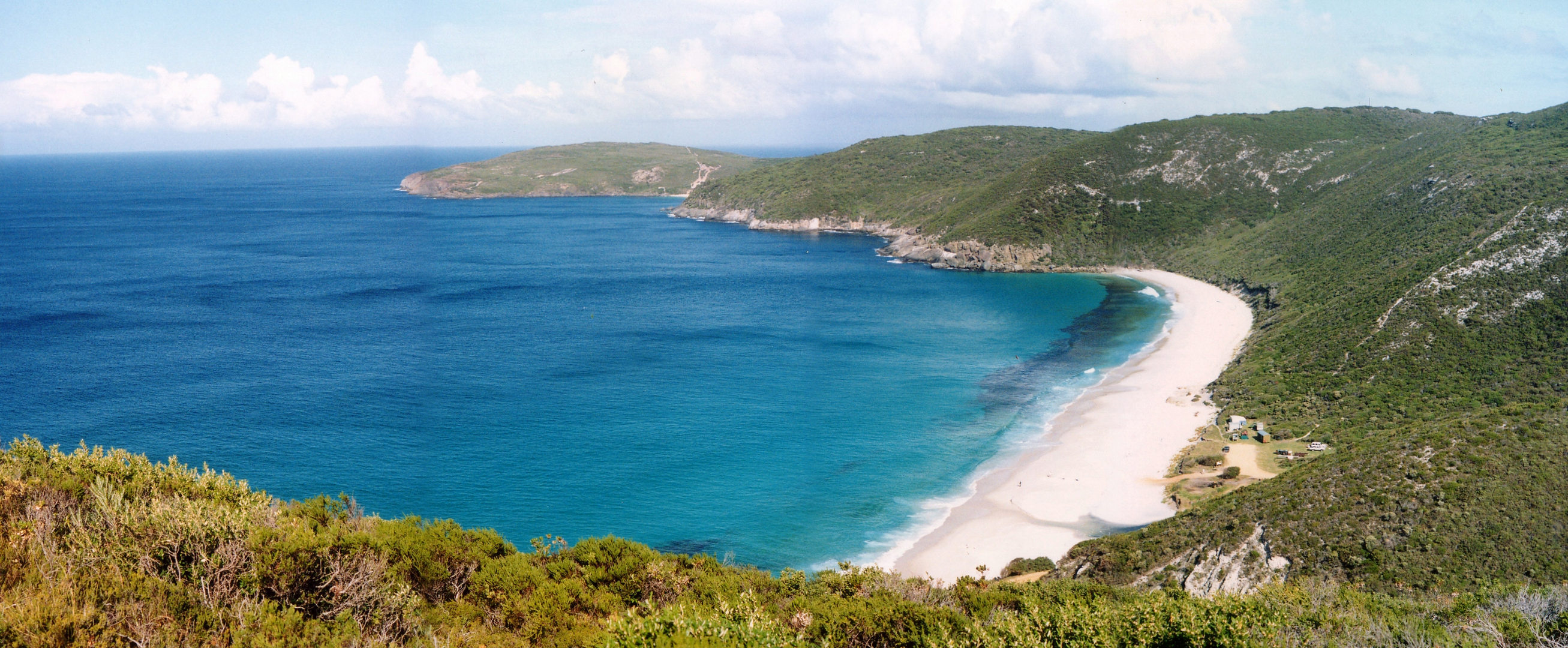
- View across Shelley Beach to Torbay Head

- Location within Western Australia
- Location: Western Australia
- Nearest city: Denmark
- Coordinates: 35°06′22″S 117°35′34″E
- Area: 36.05 km^{2} (13.92 sq mi)
- Established: 1985
- Governing body: Department of Parks and Wildlife
- Website: Official website

West Cape Howe National Park is a national park in Western Australia, 390 kilometres (240 mi) southeast of Perth. The park is found between Albany and Denmark within the City of Albany and in the Great Southern region.

Torbay Head, the most southerly point of the mainland of Western Australia, is situated within the park. The park is abutted against the coast of the Southern Ocean and takes up approximately 23 km (14 mi) of the coastline between Lowlands Beach and Forsythe Bluff.

== History ==
The park began as being vested in the Shire of Albany in 1977 for the purposes of recreation. By 1985 the area was gazetted as C Class Reserve after agreement between the shire and vested in the National Parks and Nature Conservancy Authority. Following the addition of an extra 41 ha (100 acres) that was a timber reserve along the northern boundary the park was given an A Class status in 1987. The park is now a single reserve (26177) and is made up of an area of 3,517 ha (8,690 acres). The rare and ancient Main's assassin spider, currently listed as threatened, was found to inhabit the park during a survey conducted in 2008.

== Flora ==
The park is home to a range of habitats including karri forest, coastal heath and wetlands each of which support a diverse array of vegetation and plant species. The area around Lake William supports a dense sedge scrub and rare species such as Amperea volubilus and an unnamed species of Melaleuca. The Albany Pitcher Plant, Cephalotus follicularis, is also found in the park.

== Facilities ==
Due to the sandy nature of many of the tracks, much of the park is accessible only to four-wheel drive vehicles, although all vehicles may reach the popular Shelley Beach where a campground is located. Shelley Beach also has a look-out, toilet and barbecue launching facilities for hang-gliders. The nearby Golden Gate Beach is also a popular location for surfers.

Western Australia's long-distance walking trail, the Bibbulmun Track passes through the park. The park has many facilities for bushwalkers, with a 15 kilometres (9.3 mi) return trip spur-trail from the track to Torbay Head and a boardwalk section of the track. In the west of the park, there is an overnight shelter for walkers that sleeps between 12 and 15 persons; the rest site is named "West Cape Howe Campsite".

== See also ==
- Protected areas of Western Australia
- West Cape Howe
