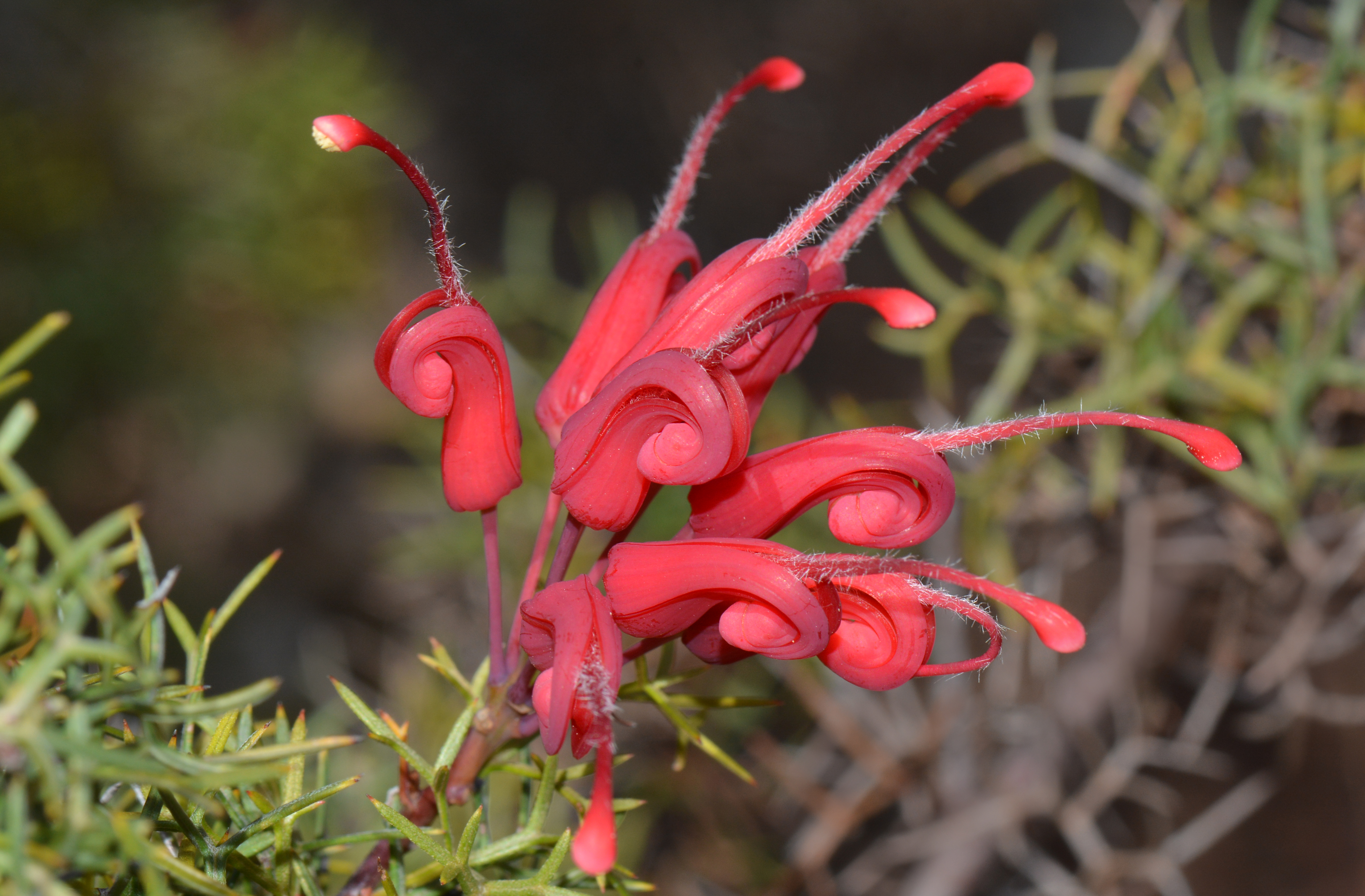

Scientific classification
- Kingdom: Plantae
- Clade: Tracheophytes
- Clade: Angiosperms
- Clade: Eudicots
- Order: Proteales
- Family: Proteaceae
- Genus: Grevillea
- Species: G. wilsonii

Binomial name
- Grevillea wilsonii A.Cunn.

Synonyms
- Grevillea lindleyana Meisn.; Grevillea thelemanniana Meisn. nom. inval., pro syn.; Grevillea wilsoni A.Cunn. orth. var.

= Grevillea wilsonii =

Wilson's grevillea

Species of shrub endemic to Western Australia

Grevillea wilsonii, also known as Wilson's grevillea or native fuchsia, is species of flowering plant in the family Proteaceae and is endemic to the south-west of Western Australia. It is an erect shrub with deeply divided leaves, the end lobes linear, and erect, more or less spherical clusters of red flowers

== Description ==
Grevillea wilsonii is an erect, compact to spreading shrub that typically grows to a height of 0.4–1 m (1 ft 4 in – 3 ft 3 in), and forms a lignotuber. Its leaves are mostly 20–60 mm (0.79–2.36 in) long and 400–600 mm (16–24 in) wide in outline, and deeply lobed. The leaves have 6 to 13 widely-spreading lobes, these lobes further divided, the end lobes linear, 5–30 mm (0.20–1.18 in) long and 0.7–1.1 mm (0.028–0.043 in) wide. The edges of the lobes are rolled under, enclosing the lower surface apart from the mid-vein. The grooves either side of the mid-vein are hairy. The flowers are erect and arranged in sometimes branched clusters, each cluster more or less spherical on a rachis 4–16 mm (0.16–0.63 in) long, the flowers nearer the base of the rachis flowering first. The flowers are green in the bud stage, later red, becoming black as they age, the pistil 30.0–35.5 mm (1.18–1.40 in) long. Flowering mainly occurs from July to December and the fruit is a more or less spherical to oblong follicle 12.5–18 mm (0.49–0.71 in) long.

== Taxonomy ==
Grevillea wilsonii was first formally described in 1835 by botanist Allan Cunningham in Thomas Braidwood Wilson's Narrative of a Voyage Round the World from specimens Cunningham collected on the "Morrilup and Porrongorup mountains". The specific epithet honours Wilson.

== Distribution ==
Wilson's grevillea grows in jarrah forest or woodland between Bindoon, Harvey, Northam and Williams in the Avon Wheatbelt, Jarrah Forest, and Swan Coastal Plain bioregions of south-western Western Australia.

== Conservation status ==
Grevillea wilsonii is listed as "not threatened" by the Government of Western Australia Department of Biodiversity, Conservation and Attractions.

== Use in horticulture ==
This species requires a well-drained soil and full sun or partial shade. Propagation is from cuttings; grafting on the east coast of Australia may ensure greater reliability.
