= West Cape Howe =

Headland in Western Australia

- Cape
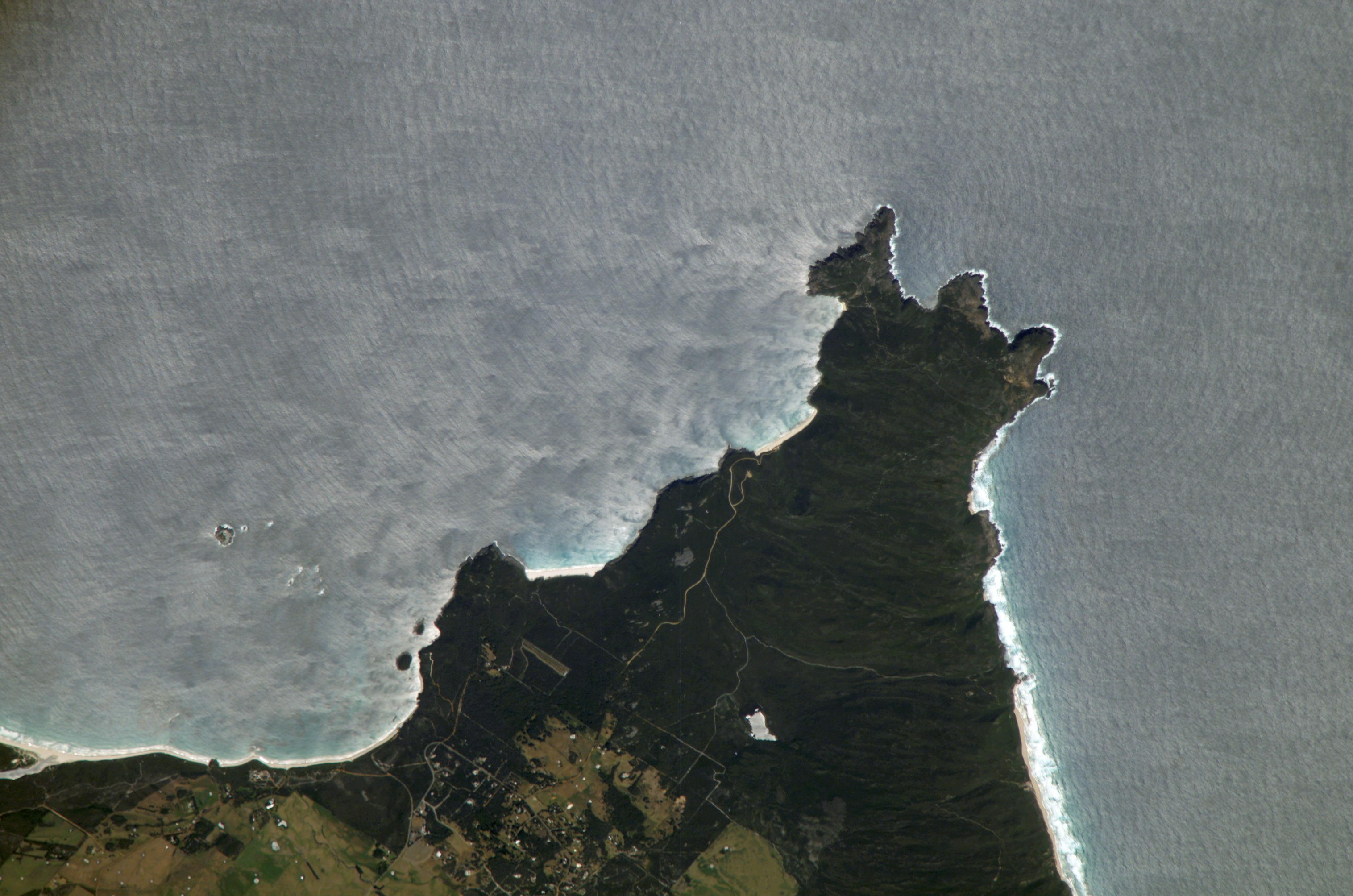
- View of West Cape Howe taken during ISS Expedition 16 in 2008

- Location in Western Australia
- Coordinates: 35°08′S 117°38′E
- Location: Australia
- West Cape Howe

West Cape Howe is a coastal headland near Albany, Western Australia that forms the westernmost extent of the Great Australian Bight, and is therefore the southernmost point in Western Australia and in all of Australia west of the 136th meridian east.

Torbay Head, located within West Cape Howe, is the southernmost point in Western Australia.

The cape is located within the locality of West Cape Howe and the West Cape Howe National Park.

== History ==
West Cape Howe was originally named Cape Howe by Captain George Vancouver on 28 September 1791, in honour of Admiral Howe. This Cape Howe was renamed West Cape Howe by Matthew Flinders on 8 December 1801, to distinguish it from the Cape Howe in eastern Australia.
