= Torbay Head =

Point in Western Australia

- Cape
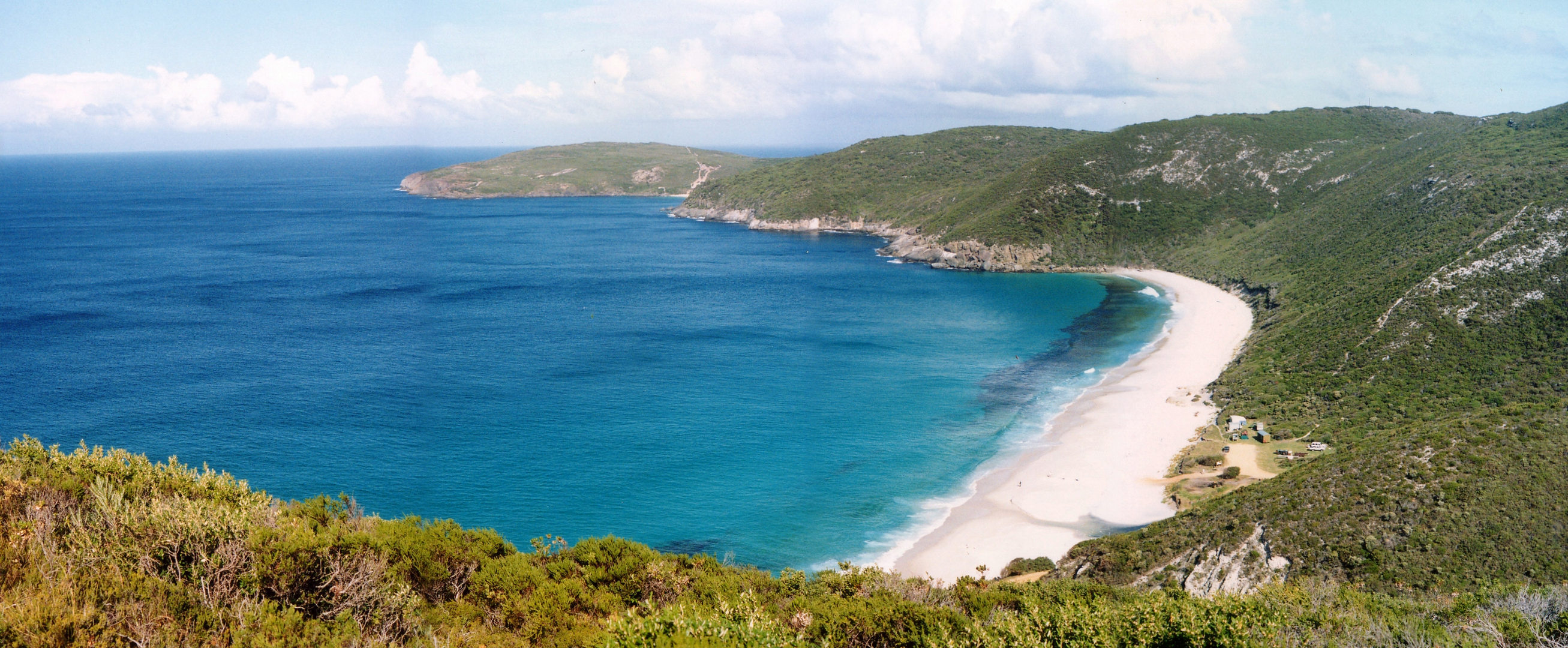
- Looking across Shelley Beach to Torbay Head

- Location within Western Australia
- Coordinates: 35.13513°S 117.63968°E
- Location: West Cape Howe National Park, Albany, Western Australia
- Torbay Head

Torbay Head is a headland on West Cape Howe, in West Cape Howe National Park, Albany, Western Australia. It is the southernmost point in Western Australia. It was named by George Vancouver in 1792.

Torbay Head is on the traditional land of the Minang people of the Noongar nation.
