= Thomas Braidwood Wilson =

Australian surgeon and explorer (1792–1843)

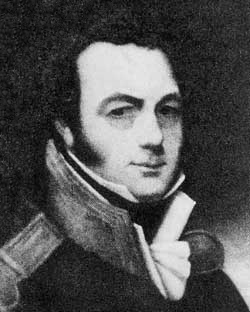
Thomas Braidwood Wilson

Thomas Braidwood Wilson FRGS (bapt. 29 April 1792 – 11 November 1843) was an Australian surgeon and explorer. He was baptised in Kirknewton, West Lothian, Scotland, the son of James, and Catherine Boak.

== Sea voyages ==
Wilson studied at Edinburgh University and became a Doctor of Medicine. He joined the Royal Navy in 1815 and made nine voyages to Australia as a surgeon-superintendent on convict ships.

The times were very dangerous and many of the sea voyages were eventful. In 1829 he travelled on the return journey of the Governor Ready to Australia when it was shipwrecked in the Torres Strait. Wilson and some of the crew rowed 1,600 kilometres (1,000 mi) to Timor.

Aboard the ship, John, Wilson returned in 1831 to Hobart Town with a hive of bees, that had survived the trip to Australia, and many European plants. The bees were considered to be the first European bees brought to Tasmania. Wilson was presented with an engraved snuffbox with the inscription praising him for, "introducing to (the colony) some of the most valuable plants and animals, but especially the honeybee, which are now in a manner become indigenous to it."

The following table details the nine voyages Wilson made as a surgeon-superintendent on convict ships.

Ship	Dep. Date	Dep. Location	Arr. Date	Arr. Location
Richmond	27/11/1821	Sheerness, England	30/04/1822	Van Diemen's Land
Prince Regent	13/02/1824	Cork, Ireland	15/07/1824	New South Wales
Mangles	23/10/1825	Cork, Ireland	18/02/1826	New South Wales
Governor Ready	03/04/1827	Portsmouth, England	31/07/1827	Van Diemen's Land
Governor Ready	21/09/1828	Cork, Ireland	16/01/1829	New South Wales
John	14/10/1830	Spithead, England	28/01/1831	Van Diemen's Land
England	04/04/1832	Spithead, England	18/07/1832	Van Diemen's Land
Moffatt	29/01/1834	Plymouth, England	09/05/1834	Van Diemen's Land
Strathfieldsay	18/02/1836	Portsmouth, England	15/06/1836	New South Wales

== Exploration ==
Wilson sailed in the ship, Governor Phillip to the Swan River in Western Australia with Captain Collet Barker. From there he explored the region inland from King George Sound. Captain Barker was the Commandant at King George Sound and provided the provisions for the expedition. Wilson named the hill overlooking the future township of Mount Barker in his honour. During these expeditions Wilson collected seeds and species to bring back to his friend, Allan Cunningham at the Sydney Botanical Gardens. A species of grevillea from Western Australia, Grevillea wilsonii, was named after him. Wilson's inlet in Western Australia is also named after him. King George Sound is now home to the thriving town of Albany.

In 1833 Wilson was granted a fellowship of the Royal Geographical Society.

== Journal and travel writing ==
Wilson wrote of his travel experiences and published them in 1835. The title page of the book describes the contents as:

...an account of, the wreck of the ship "Governor Ready" in Torres Straits; a Description of the British Settlements on the Coasts of New Holland, more particularly Raffles Bay, Melville Island, Swan River and King George's Sound; also, the Manners and Customs of the Aboriginal Tribes:
with an Appendix, containing Remarks on Transportation, The Treatment of Convicts During the Voyage, and Advice to Persons Intending to Emigrate to the Australian Colonies.

– by T. B. Wilson, M.D. Surgeon, R.N.
Member of the Royal Geographical Society

In the preface Wilson states that his aim was to inform those interested in "Australian affairs" and provide amusement to the general public. He states further that the information in the appendix was based on his supervision of, "nearly two thousand prisoners, without having met with any difficulty, or disturbance, worth mentioning."

== Pastoral life ==
Wilson married Jane Thomson of Durham, England, in 1826 at St Oswalds in Durham. In 1836 he emigrated with his wife, daughter Mary Braidwood Wilson (b. 1827), and son James Braidwood Wilson (b. 1833), to Australia.

Wilson's first land grants were in the Oatlands area of Tasmania, however he exchanged these for grants in the Braidwood district before settling there in 1835. Wilson's grants in Braidwood amounted to 2,000 hectares (5,000 acres) in recognition of his exploration, to which he added another 1,600 plushectares (4,000 plusacres) of purchased and leased land. The family property was known as "Braidwood Farm" (since changed to "Mona"). When the township was formed it took the name of Braidwood in his honour because Wilson relinquished an area from the western end of his property to be used as the site for the new town. He became a pastoralist and was noted for the good management of his land. He also served as a magistrate, and funded the building on the courthouse in Braidwood. He was on many local committees and took an active interest in district affairs.

At Wilson's death his daughter, Mary Braidwood Wilson, was 16. She kept a diary that covered her life after her father's death, and during her marriage to Stewart Marjoribanks Mowle. The diary is now in the National Library of Australia and is seen as a clear and detailed record of early expatriate life in Australia.

== Death and grave site ==
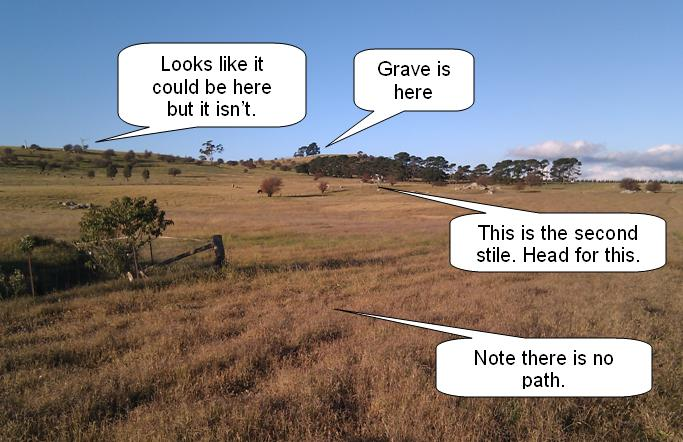
The location of Braidwood Wilson's grave viewed from 80 metres past the first stile.

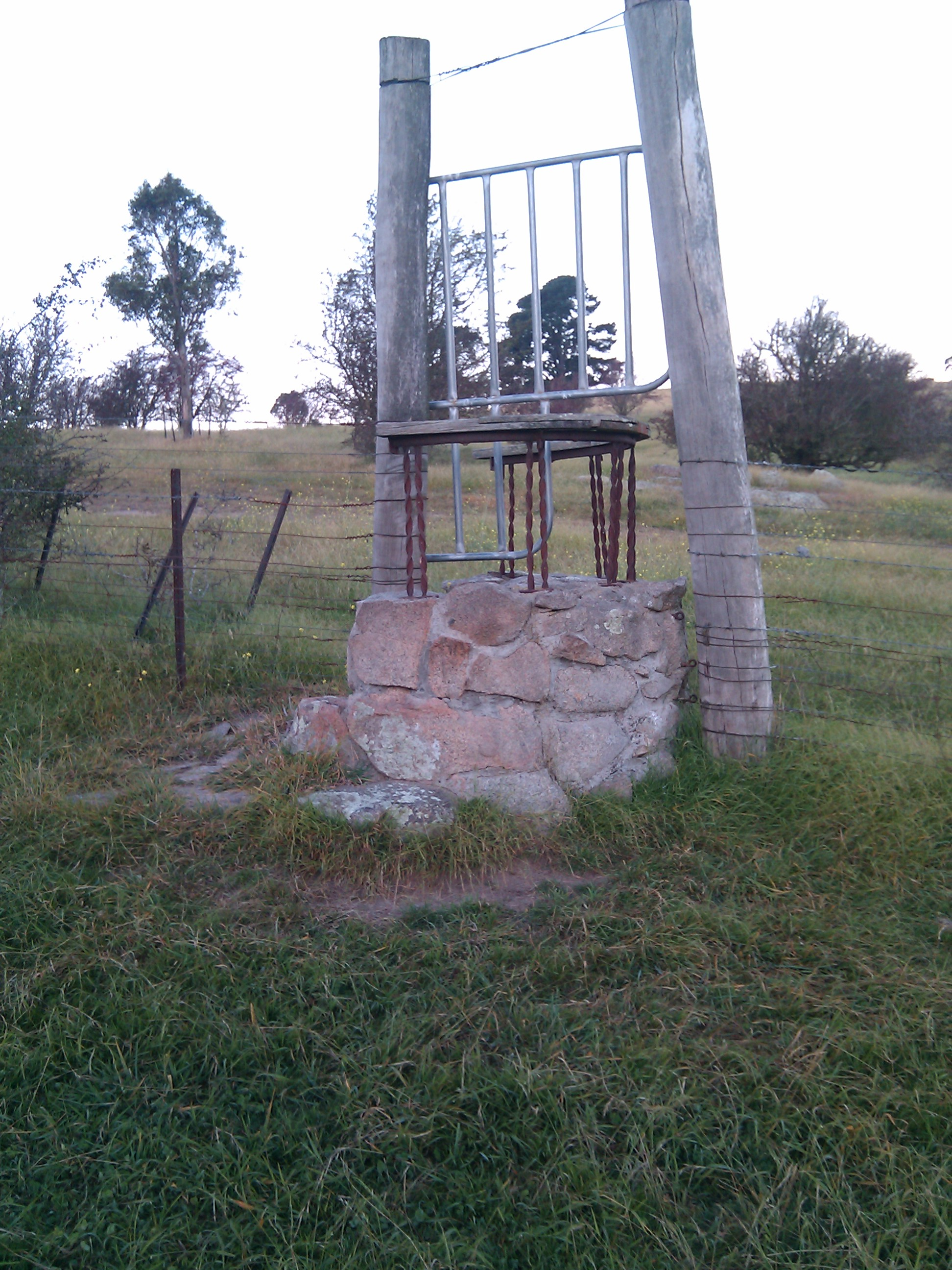
The fourth stile and most elaborate on the route to Thomas Braidwood Wilson's grave.

Wilson's third child, Thomas Braidwood, died at the age of five months on 23 September 1837 and Wilson built a vault at the top of a hill just north of the town for his burial. His wife died not long after on 29 January 1838 and was also buried in the vault. The location (35°26′2.31″S 149°48′44.8″E) boasts a beautiful view over the town of Braidwood and a large pine tree has been grown adjacent to the vault.

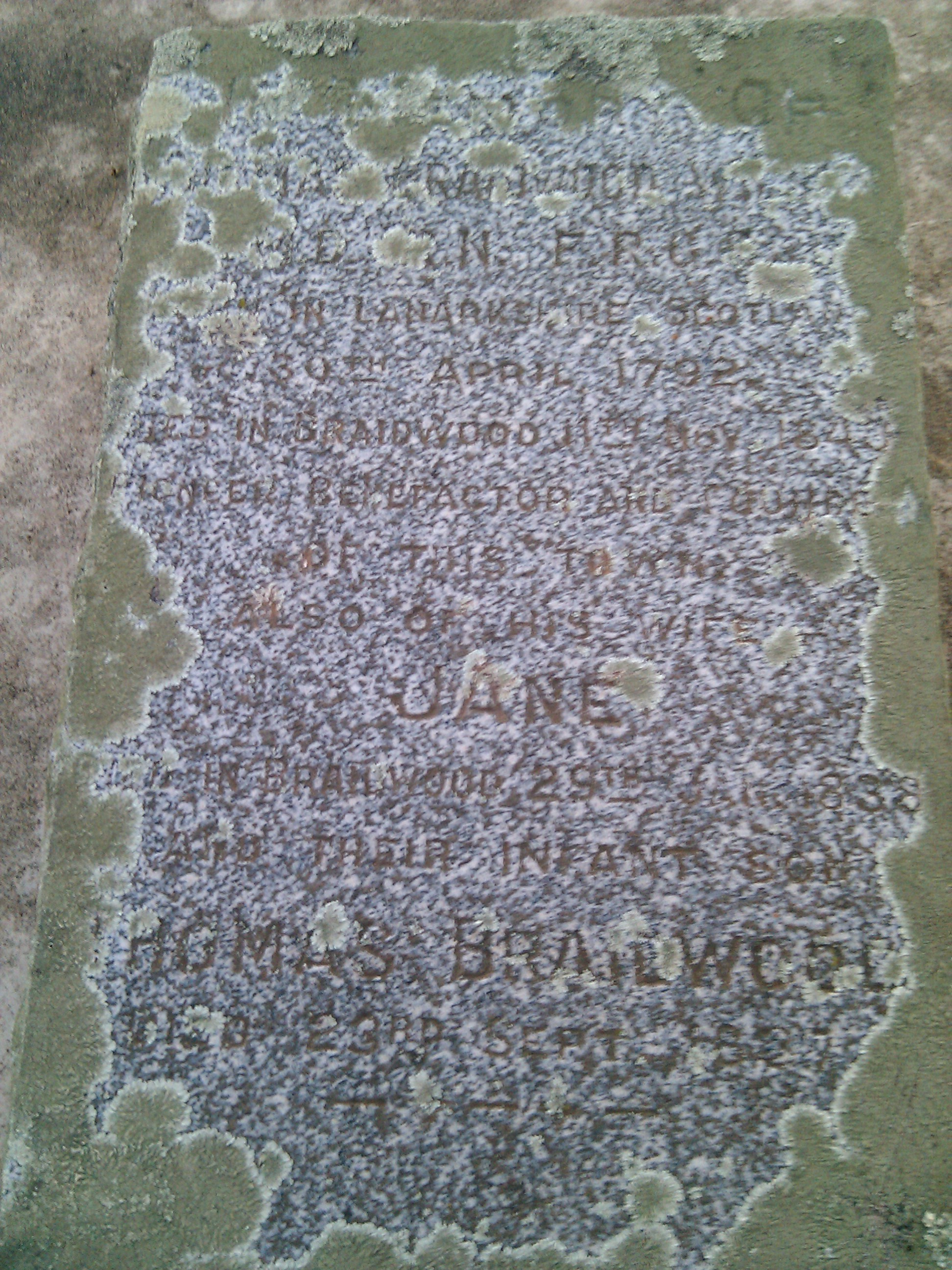
The grave stone of Thomas Braidwood Wilson. His wife and youngest son are interred here as well.

During the drought and depression of the early 1840s Wilson was declared bankrupt and on 11 November 1843 it is thought that he probably committed suicide. He was buried with his wife and child in the vault. The grave site fell into disrepair but was repaired and a path from the town added some time after April 2006. The route to the site is unclear (mapped here) and the absence of a track indicates it is rarely visited. The public way was in general use during the late 19th century and until the early 2000s. Community projects were arranged to restore the grave site in 1894 and in 1935, and the stiles were built with a Community Bicentennial Grant in 1988. On change of ownership of the property on which the grave sits, access was closed off by the owner in about 2005 and it is now rarely used as the stiles have been deliberately broken or locked off. Strong community pride in the site has seen several attempts at rectifying this, and it is hoped that during Braidwood's 175 anniversary celebrations in 2014 the stiles can be restored and the path reopened. The route commences with the first stile (35.437818°S 149.801019°E) at the corner of the Kings Highway and Wallace Street at the North end of town and is a 1.3 kilometres (1,400 yd) walk. You must proceed from stile to stile as barbed wire fences block alternative routes. From the second wooden stile (in poor repair) (35°26′13.75″S 149°48′17.26″E) head to the north east of the paddock to the third metal stile (35°26′6.22″S 149°48′28.87″E) and from there east to the fourth stile(35°26′4.36″S 149°48′36.88″E). If the stile is locked proceed north along the fence to the gate. From here the route is obvious.

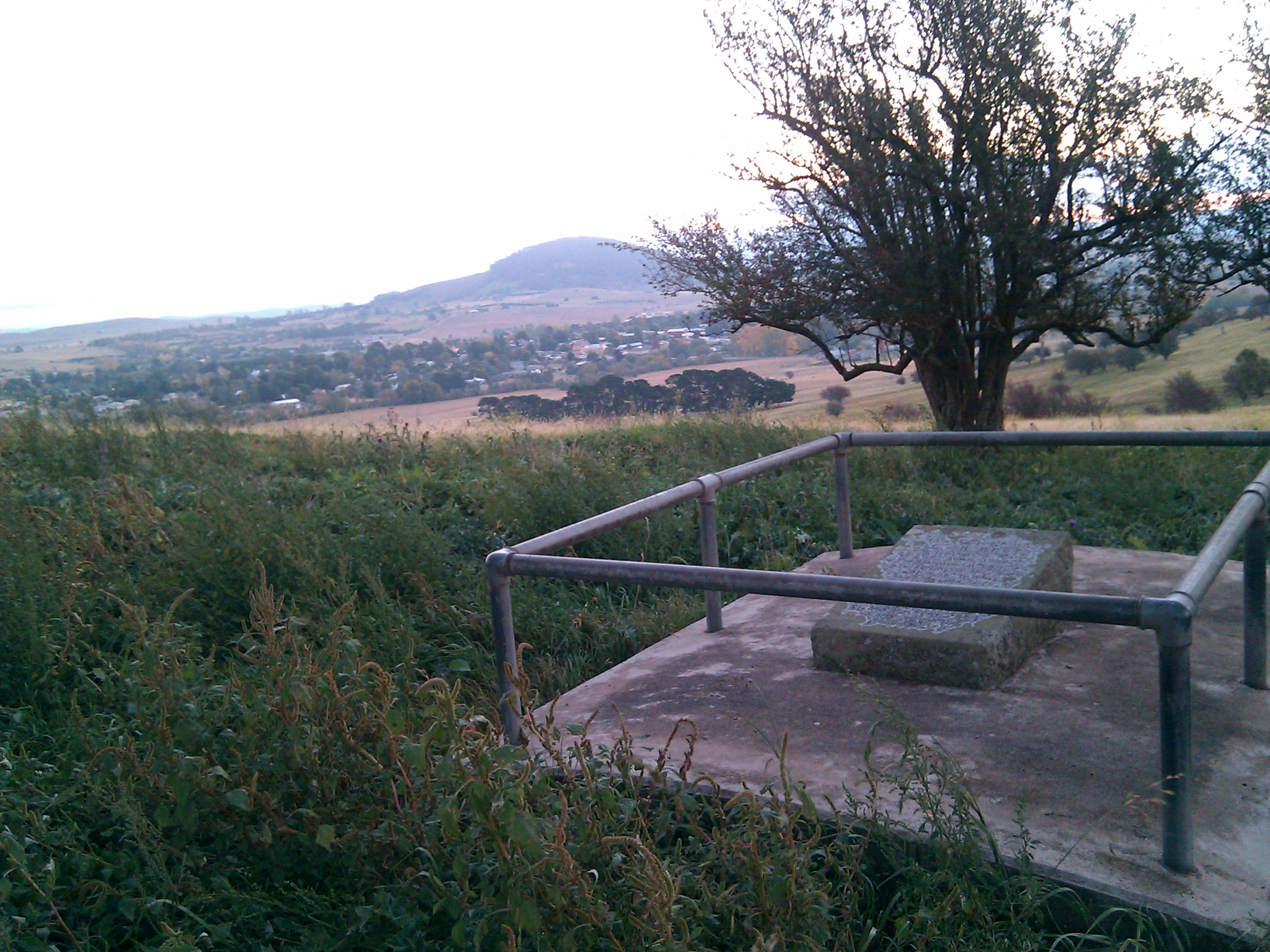
A view from Braidwood Wilson's grave south towards Braidwood.
