= Kronkup, Western Australia =

Locality in the City of Albany, Western Australia

Kronkup
- other
- Coordinates: 35°2′6″S 117°37′49″E
- Country: Australia
- State: Western Australia
- LGA: City of Albany

Government
  - State electorate: Albany
  - Federal division: O'Connor

Area
  - Total: 16.4 km^{2} (6.3 sq mi)
- Elevation: 43 m (141 ft)

Population
  - Total: 262 (2021)
  - Density: 15.98/km^{2} (41.38/sq mi)
- Postcode: 6330

Kronkup is a locality of the City of Albany in the Great Southern region of Western Australia. It stretches from the South Coast Highway, on its northern border, to the Southern Ocean in the south.

Kronkup was a stopping place on the Albany to Denmark railway line, which was extended to Nornalup in 1929 and closed down in 1957. In the 1920s the locality had a range of clubs. A rifle club, a cricket club, and a local hall.

== Demographics ==
As of the 2021 Australian census, 262 people resided in Kronkup, up from 210 in the 2016 census. The median age of persons in Kronkup was 50 years. There were more males than females, with 52.1% of the population male and 47.9% female. The average household size was 2.5 people per household.
