= Bindoon-Julimar Important Bird Area =

Important Bird Area in Western Australia

Coordinates: 31°21′36″S 116°16′32″E

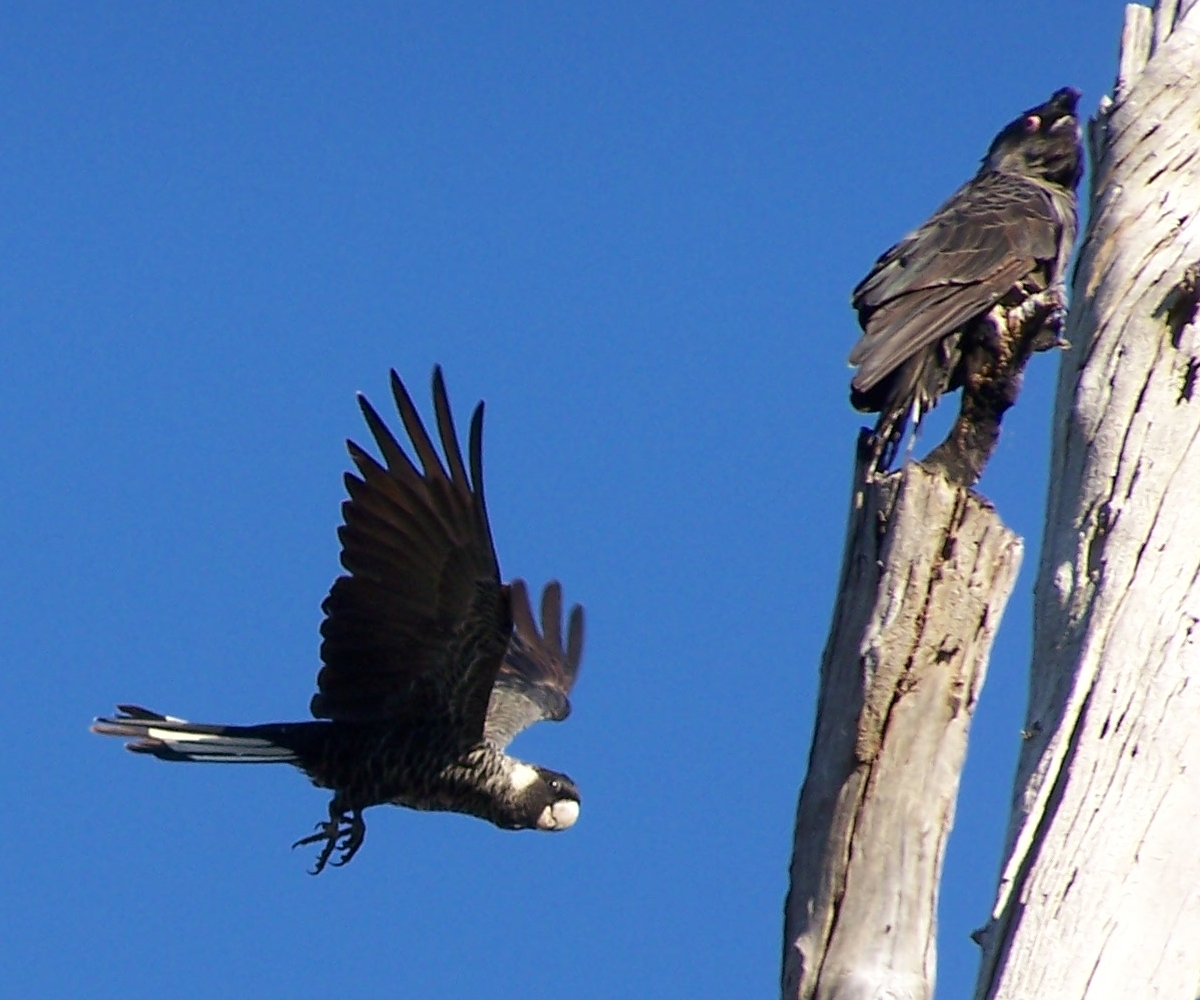
The IBA is important for short-billed black cockatoos

The Bindoon-Julimar Important Bird Area is a fragmented 525 km^{2} tract of land in the northern Darling Ranges, of south-western Western Australia. It is about 5 km east of the town of Bindoon and 80 km north of Perth, on the edge of the wheatbelt. It lies between the Calingiri and Northern Swan Coastal Plain IBAs.

== Description ==
Site boundaries of the IBA are defined by blocks of native vegetation known or expected to support nesting and feeding black cockatoos in several reserves, on private land and a Defence Department training area. The native vegetation remains in good condition and there are few nest competitors such as galahs, corellas and feral honeybees. The area has a Mediterranean climate.

== Birds ==
The site has been identified as an Important Bird Area (IBA) by BirdLife International because it supports at least 110 pairs of breeding short-billed black-cockatoos in both breeding and feeding habitat - the largest population of breeding birds in south-western Australia. The IBA also contains populations of biome-restricted red-capped parrots, rufous treecreepers, western spinebills, western thornbills and western yellow robins.
