= Neerabup National Park =

National park in Western Australia

- IUCN category II (national park)
- Location within Western Australia
- Location: Western Australia
- Nearest city: Perth
- Coordinates: 31°40′30″S 115°44′07″E
- Area: 9.43 km^{2} (3.64 sq mi)
- Established: 1965
- Governing body: Department of Environment and Conservation
- Website: parks.dpaw.wa.gov.au/park/neerabup

Neerabup National Park is a national park in the City of Wanneroo in Western Australia, situated approximately 27 kilometres (17 mi) north of Perth.

The park lies to the west of Wanneroo Road and is a long thin strip of bushland that is about 12 km (7.5 mi) in length. It contains no car parks and roads or any other facilities and attracts no entrance fee.

The area protects part of an ancient Aboriginal Australian migration route between Lake Joondalup and Loch McNess (in Yanchep National Park). This later became a well used stock route and then part of the Yaberoo Budjara Heritage Trail. The trail is based on Yellagonga's tribe's movements between the lakes and highlights features of historical, Aboriginal and natural significance.

The park lies within the Northern Swan Coastal Plain Important Bird Area, so identified by BirdLife International because of its importance in supporting several thousand short-billed black cockatoos during the non-breeding season.

== See also ==
- Protected areas of Western Australia
