= Hibbertia propinqua =

Conservation status
- Priority Four — Rare Taxa (DEC)

Scientific classification
- Kingdom: Plantae
- Clade: Tracheophytes
- Clade: Angiosperms
- Clade: Eudicots
- Order: Dilleniales
- Family: Dilleniaceae
- Genus: Hibbertia
- Species: H. propinqua

Binomial name
- Hibbertia propinqua K.R.Thiele

Species of flowering plant

Hibbertia propinqua is a species of flowering plant in the family Dilleniaceae and is endemic to a restricted area in the west of Western Australia. It is an erect to spreading shrub with linear to narrow oblong leaves and yellow flowers arranged amongst clusters of leaves, the flowers with eight to ten stamens all on one side of the two carpels.

== Description ==
Hibbertia propinqua is an erect to spreading shrub that typically grows to a height of up to 50 cm (20 in), the young stems winged and covered with white hairs. The leaves are linear to narrow oblong, sometimes in clusters near the ends of branchlets, 12–20 mm (0.47–0.79 in) long and 1.6–2.0 mm (0.063–0.079 in) wide and hairy. The flowers are arranged amongst leaf clusters on peduncles 8–16 mm (0.31–0.63 in) long with narrow egg-shaped bracts 4.0–5.5 mm (0.16–0.22 in) long at the base. The five sepals are fused at the base, the outer lobes egg-shaped and 5.0–6.5 mm (0.20–0.26 in) long, the inner lobes shorter but broader than the outer ones. The five petals are yellow, 8–12 mm (0.31–0.47 in) long and egg-shaped with the narrower end towards the base. There are eight to ten stamens all on one side of the two carpels, each carpel with two ovules. Flowering has been recorded from August to September.

== Taxonomy ==
Hibbertia propinqua was first formally described in 2009 by Kevin Thiele in the journal Nuytsia from specimens collected near Warradarge by Michael Clyde Hislop in 2002. The specific epithet (propinqua) means "near" or "neighbouring", referring to the similarity of this species to H. fasciculiflora.

== Distribution and habitat ==
This species grows in woodland and kwongan between Eneabba and the Coomallo Nature Reserve in the Geraldton Sandplains biogeographic region in the west of Western Australia.

== Conservation status ==
Hibbertia propinqua is classified as "Priority Four" by the Government of Western Australia Department of Biodiversity, Conservation and Attractions, meaning that is rare or near threatened.

== See also ==
- List of Hibbertia species
