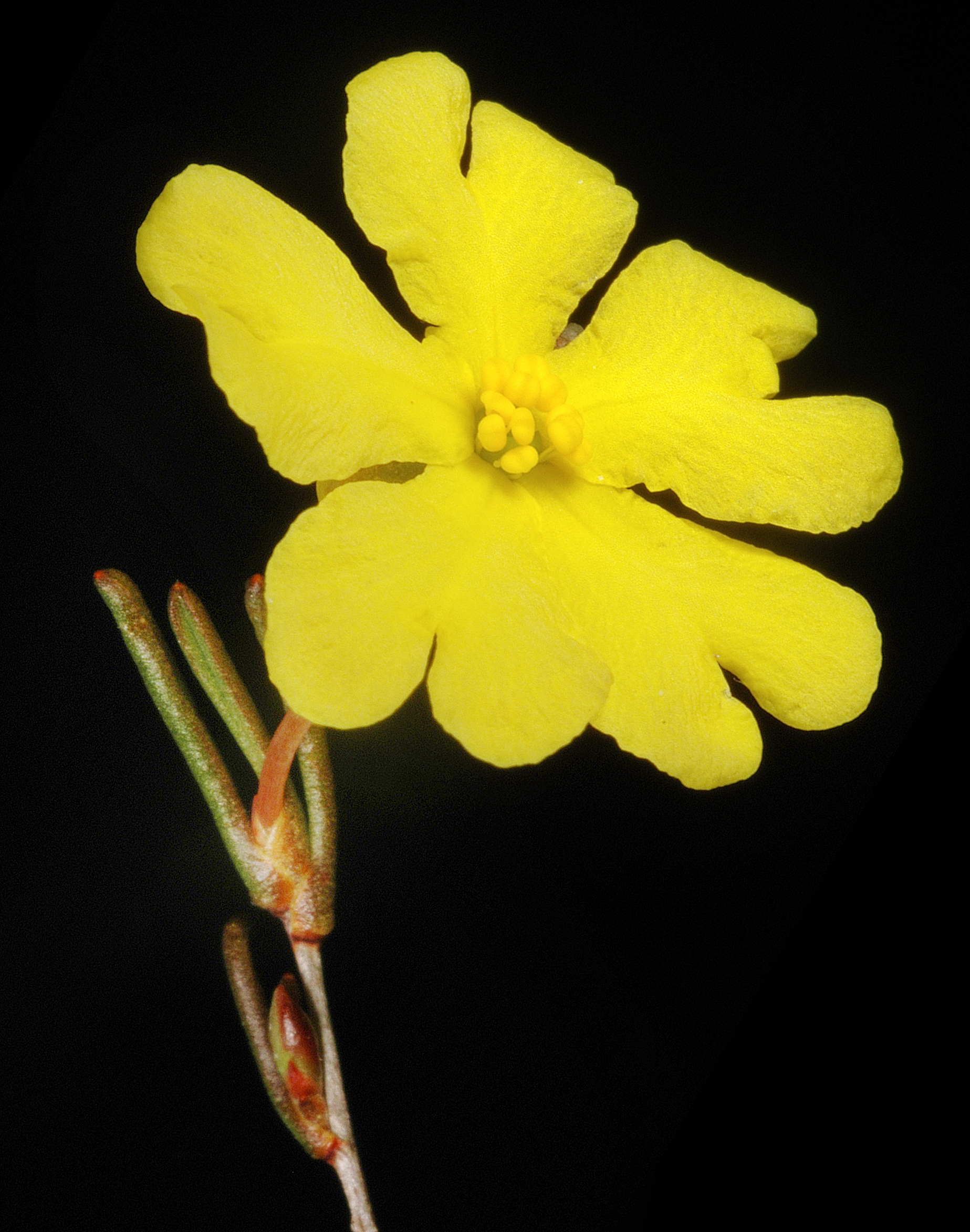

Conservation status
- Priority Two — Poorly Known Taxa (DEC)

Scientific classification
- Kingdom: Plantae
- Clade: Tracheophytes
- Clade: Angiosperms
- Clade: Eudicots
- Order: Dilleniales
- Family: Dilleniaceae
- Genus: Hibbertia
- Species: H. leptopus

Binomial name
- Hibbertia leptopus Benth.

= Hibbertia leptopus =

Species of flowering plant

Hibbertia leptopus is a species of flowering plant in the family Dilleniaceae and is endemic to Western Australia. It is an erect shrub with linear leaves and yellow flowers, usually with eleven stamens arranged around the three carpels.

== Description ==
Hibbertia leptopus is a shrub that typically grows to a height of up to 50 cm (20 in) and has more or less glabrous foliage. The leaves are linear to narrow egg-shaped with the narrower end towards the base, 10–15 mm (0.39–0.59 in) long and 0.5–1.5 mm (0.020–0.059 in) wide and sessile. The flowers are arranged singly in leaf axils on a peduncle 6–13 mm (0.24–0.51 in) long with two brown, egg-shaped bracts 0.6–1.5 mm (0.024–0.059 in) long at the base. The five sepals are joined at the base, 2.6–3.0 mm (0.10–0.12 in) long, the outer sepals narrower than the inner sepals. The five petals are yellow, egg-shaped with the narrower end towards the base and 3.5–4.0 mm (0.14–0.16 in) long with a deep notch at the tip. There are usually eleven stamens, some in small groups, arranged around the three glabrous carpels that each contain a single ovule.

== Taxonomy ==
Hibbertia leptopus was first formally described in 1863 George Bentham in Flora Australiensis from specimens collected in the Swan River Colony by James Drummond. The specific epithet (leptopus) means "slender foot", referring to the peduncles.

== Distribution and habitat ==
This hibbertia grows in woodland and heath from near Calingiri to near Goomalling in the Avon Wheatbelt and Jarrah Forest biogeographic regions in the south-west of Western Australia.

== Conservation status ==
Hibbertia leptopus is classified as "Priority Two" by the Western Australian Government Department of Parks and Wildlife meaning that it is poorly known and from only one or a few locations.

== See also ==
- List of Hibbertia species
