= Synaphea endothrix =

Conservation status
- Priority Three — Poorly Known Taxa (DEC)

Scientific classification
- Kingdom: Plantae
- Clade: Tracheophytes
- Clade: Angiosperms
- Clade: Eudicots
- Order: Proteales
- Family: Proteaceae
- Genus: Synaphea
- Species: S. endothrix

Binomial name
- Synaphea endothrix A.S.George

Species of Australian shrub in the family Proteaceae

Synaphea endothrix is a species of flowering plant in the family Proteaceae and is endemic to the south-west of Western Australia. It is an erect, clumped shrub with pinnatipartite lobed leaves, spikes of openly spaced yellow flowers and egg-shaped fruit.

== Description ==
Synaphea endothrix is an erect, clumped shrub with stems up to 30 cm (12 in) and covered with soft hairs when young, later glabrous. The leaves are pinnatipartite and wavy, 40–70 mm (1.6–2.8 in) long and 60–110 mm (2.4–4.3 in) wide on a petiole 15–60 mm (0.59–2.36 in) long, the end lobes lance-shaped to triangular 3–6 mm (0.12–0.24 in) wide and sharply pointed. The flowers are yellow and borne in openly spaced spikes 30–80 mm (1.2–3.1 in) long on a peduncle 40–90 mm (1.6–3.5 in) long. The perianth is moderately open, the upper tepal 5.5–6.0 mm (0.22–0.24 in) long and 2.2–2.7 mm (0.087–0.106 in) wide, the lower tepal 4.2–4.3 mm (0.17–0.17 in) long. The stigma is broadly egg-shaped with the narrower end towards the base with a shallow notch at the end, 0.9–1.2 mm (0.035–0.047 in) long and 1.0–1.3 mm (0.039–0.051 in) wide. Flowering occurs in August and September and the fruit is egg-shaped with a thick neck, 7 mm (0.28 in) long and hairy.

== Taxonomy ==
Synaphea endothrix was first formally described in 1995 by Alex George in the Flora of Australia from specimens he collected on the road to Jurien, 5 km (3.1 mi) west of the Brand Highway in 1993. The specific epithet (endothrix) means 'hairy within', referring to the hairs in the perianth.

== Distribution and habitat ==
This species of Synaphea grows on lateritic rises in kwongan in the Coomaloo-Badgingarra area in the Geraldton Sandplains bioregion of south-western Western Australia.

== Conservation status ==
Synaphea endothrix is listed as "Priority Three" by the Government of Western Australia Department of Biodiversity, Conservation and Attractions, meaning that it is poorly known and known from only a few locations but is not under imminent threat.
