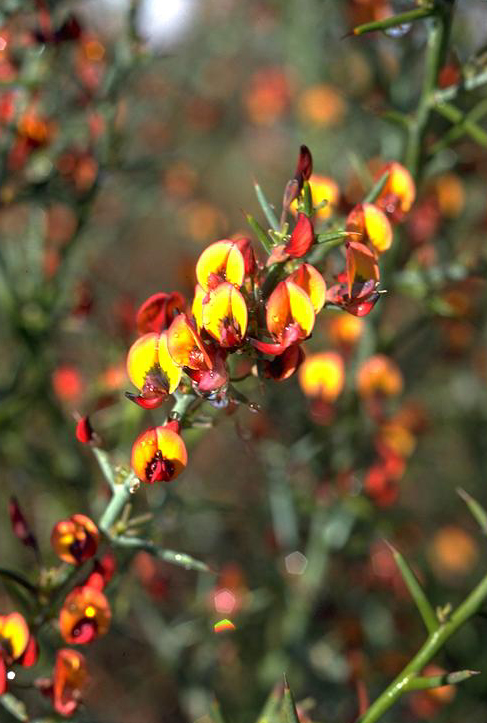

Scientific classification
- Kingdom: Plantae
- Clade: Tracheophytes
- Clade: Angiosperms
- Clade: Eudicots
- Clade: Rosids
- Order: Fabales
- Family: Fabaceae
- Subfamily: Faboideae
- Genus: Daviesia
- Species: D. brachyphylla

Binomial name
- Daviesia brachyphylla Meisn.

Synonyms
- Daviesia incrassata var. brachyphylla (Meisn.) Domin

= Daviesia brachyphylla =

Species of flowering plant

Daviesia brachyphylla is a species of flowering plant in the Fabaceae family and is endemic to the south-west of Western Australia. It is a spreading to bushy shrub with cylindrical phyllodes with a slightly downcurved point and orange, maroon and red flowers.

== Description ==
Daviesia brachyphylla is a spreading to bushy shrub that typically grows to a height of up to 80 cm (31 in) and has glabrous branchlets. Its leaves are reduced to cylindrical phyllodes 10–30 mm (0.39–1.18 in) long and 1.0–1.5 mm (0.039–0.059 in) wide with a slightly down-curved point. The flowers are arranged in groups of up to six in leaf axils on a peduncle up to 1.5 mm (0.059 in) long, each flower on a pedicel 1–4 mm (0.039–0.157 in) long with oblong bracts about 1 mm (0.039 in) long at the base. The sepals are 2.5–3.5 mm (0.098–0.138 in) long. The standard is orange with pinkish edges and a maroon base and 7–8.5 mm (0.28–0.33 in) long, the wings dark pink and 6–7 mm (0.24–0.28 in) long, the keel red and 7.0–7.5 mm (0.28–0.30 in) long. Flowering occurs from July to October and the fruit is an inflated triangular pod 10–12 mm (0.39–0.47 in) long.

== Taxonomy and naming ==
Daviesia brachyphylla was first formally described in 1844 by Carl Meissner in Lehmann's Plantae Preissianae from specimens collected by James Drummond. The specific epithet (brachyphylla) means "short-leaved".

== Distribution and habitat ==
This species of pea grows in mallee heathland, low kwongan heathland and woodland on the Darling Range from near Moora to Hyden and Ravensthorpe, in the Avon Wheatbelt, Coolgardie, Esperance Plains, Jarrah Forest, Mallee and Swan Coastal Plain biogeographic regions in the south-west of Western Australia.

== Conservation status ==
Daviesia brachyphylla is classified as "not threatened" by the Government of Western Australia Department of Biodiversity, Conservation and Attractions.
