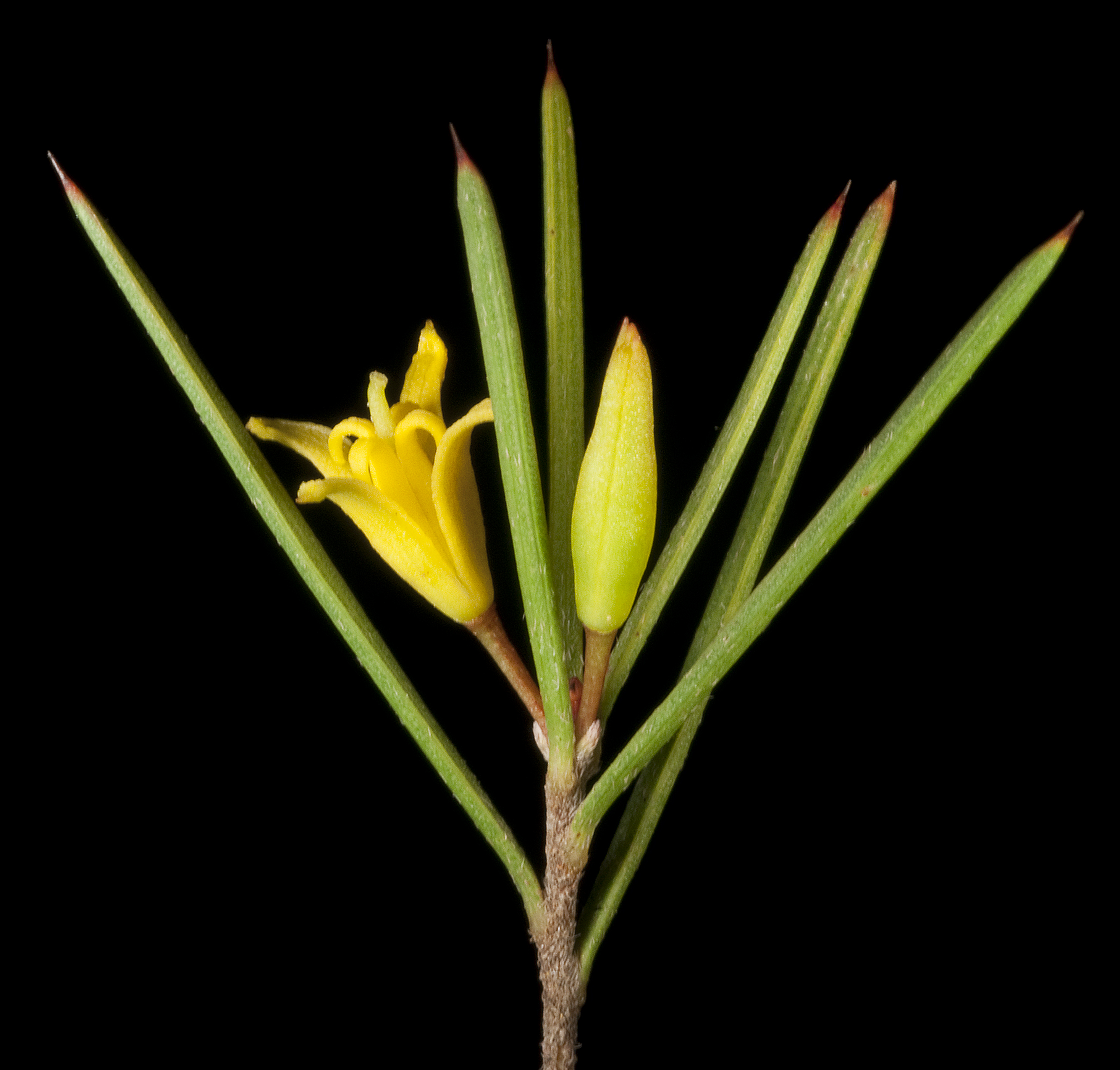

Conservation status
- Priority Four — Rare Taxa (DEC)

Scientific classification
- Kingdom: Plantae
- Clade: Tracheophytes
- Clade: Angiosperms
- Clade: Eudicots
- Order: Proteales
- Family: Proteaceae
- Genus: Persoonia
- Species: P. sulcata

Binomial name
- Persoonia sulcata Meisn.

Synonyms
- Linkia sulcata (Meisn.) Kuntze; Persoonia sulcata Meisn. nom. inval., nom. nud.

= Persoonia sulcata =

Species of flowering plant

Persoonia sulcata is a plant in the family Proteaceae and is endemic to the south-west of Western Australia. It is a small, erect or low spreading shrub with narrow, linear leaves and cylindrical yellow flowers arranged singly or in groups of up to three in leaf axils. It grows in woodland or on rocky slopes and is found in several disjunct populations.

== Description ==
Persoonia sulcata is an erect or low spreading shrub with several to many trunks and growing to a height of 0.2–1 m (0.7–3 ft). The bark on the trunk is smooth and grey. The leaves are arranged alternately and are linear in shape, mostly 15–50 mm (0.6–2 in) long and about 1 mm (0.04 in) wide. The leaves are leathery and rigid, a similar colour on both surfaces with the midvein prominent on both surfaces. They are also sharply tipped and have longitudinal furrows. The flowers are arranged singly or in groups of up to three in the axils of leaves or with a scale leaf at the base. Each flower is on the end of a glabrous pedicel 3–12 mm (0.1–0.5 in) long. The flower is composed of four glabrous yellow tepals which are 8–11 mm (0.3–0.4 in) long and fused at the base but with the tips rolled back. The central style is surrounded by four yellow anthers which are attached to the tepals with tips rolled back, so that they resembles a cross when viewed end-on. Flowering occurs from September to November and is followed by fruit which are smooth green drupes.

== Taxonomy and naming ==
Persoonia sulcata was first formally described in 1856 by Carl Meissner and the description was published in Prodromus Systematis Naturalis Regni Vegetabilis. The specific epithet (sulcata) is a Latin word meaning "furrow" or "plow".

== Distribution and habitat ==
This persoonia grows in Eucalyptus woodland, sometimes on rocky slopes in two areas - in the New Norcia - Calingiri - Mogumber area and in the John Forrest National Park. These two populations are in the Avon Wheatbelt, Geraldton Sandplains, Jarrah Forest and Swan Coastal Plain biogeographic regions.

== Conservation ==
Persoonia sulcata is classified as "Priority Four" by the Government of Western Australia Department of Parks and Wildlife, meaning that is rare or near threatened.
