= Styphelia filamentosa =

Conservation status
- Priority Three — Poorly Known Taxa (DEC)

Scientific classification
- Kingdom: Plantae
- Clade: Tracheophytes
- Clade: Angiosperms
- Clade: Eudicots
- Clade: Asterids
- Order: Ericales
- Family: Ericaceae
- Genus: Styphelia
- Species: S. filamentosa

Binomial name
- Styphelia filamentosa Hislop & Puente-Lel.

Species of plant

Styphelia filamentosa is a species of flowering plant in the heath family Ericaceae and is endemic to a small area in the south-west of Western Australia. It is a low, compact, spreading shrub with egg-shaped to narrowly elliptic leaves, and white, tube-shaped flowers arranged singly, or in groups of up to four in leaf axils.

== Description ==
Styphelia filamentosa is a low, compact, spreading shrub that typically grows up to 30 cm (12 in) high and 50 cm (20 in) wide, its young branchlets with a few sparse hairs. The leaves are erect, narrowly egg-shaped to narrowly elliptic, 5–11 mm (0.20–0.43 in) long and 1.2–2.0 mm (0.047–0.079 in) wide on a petiole 0.3–0.6 mm (0.012–0.024 in) long. There is a sharp point on the end of the leaves and both surfaces are glabrous, the upper surface dark green and the lower surface a much lighter shade of green. The flowers are arranged singly or in groups of up to 4 in leaf axils, with egg-shaped to round bracts 0.4–1.0 mm (0.016–0.039 in) long and egg-shaped bracteoles 1.0–1.7 mm (0.039–0.067 in) long and 1.2–1.4 mm (0.047–0.055 in) long at the base. The sepals are narrowly egg-shaped, 2.5–3.2 mm (0.098–0.126 in) long and 1.0–1.2 mm (0.039–0.047 in) wide, the petals white, forming a tube 1.2–1.8 mm (0.047–0.071 in) long with lobes 2.3–2.8 mm (0.091–0.110 in) long. Flowering occurs from October to December and the fruit is a narrowly elliptic to more or less cylindrical, 2.1–2.5 mm (0.083–0.098 in) long and 0.9–1.1 mm (0.035–0.043 in) wide.

== Taxonomy ==
Styphelia filamentosa was first formally described in 2017 by Michael Clyde Hislop and Caroline Puente-Lelievre in the journal Nuytsia from specimens collected by Hislop in the Alexander Morrison National Park in 2008. The specific epithet (filamentosa) means "thread-like", referring to the thread-like lobes of the anthers.

== Distribution and habitat ==
This styphelia grows in the understorey of heath on deep sand between Eneabba and the Coomallo Nature Reserve east of Jurien Bay in the Geraldton Sandplains bioregion of south-western Western Australia.

== Conservation status ==
Styphelia filamentosa is listed as "Priority Three" by the Government of Western Australia Department of Parks and Wildlife meaning that it is poorly known and known from only a few locations but is not under imminent threat.
