= Calingiri, Western Australia =

Calingiri
- Town
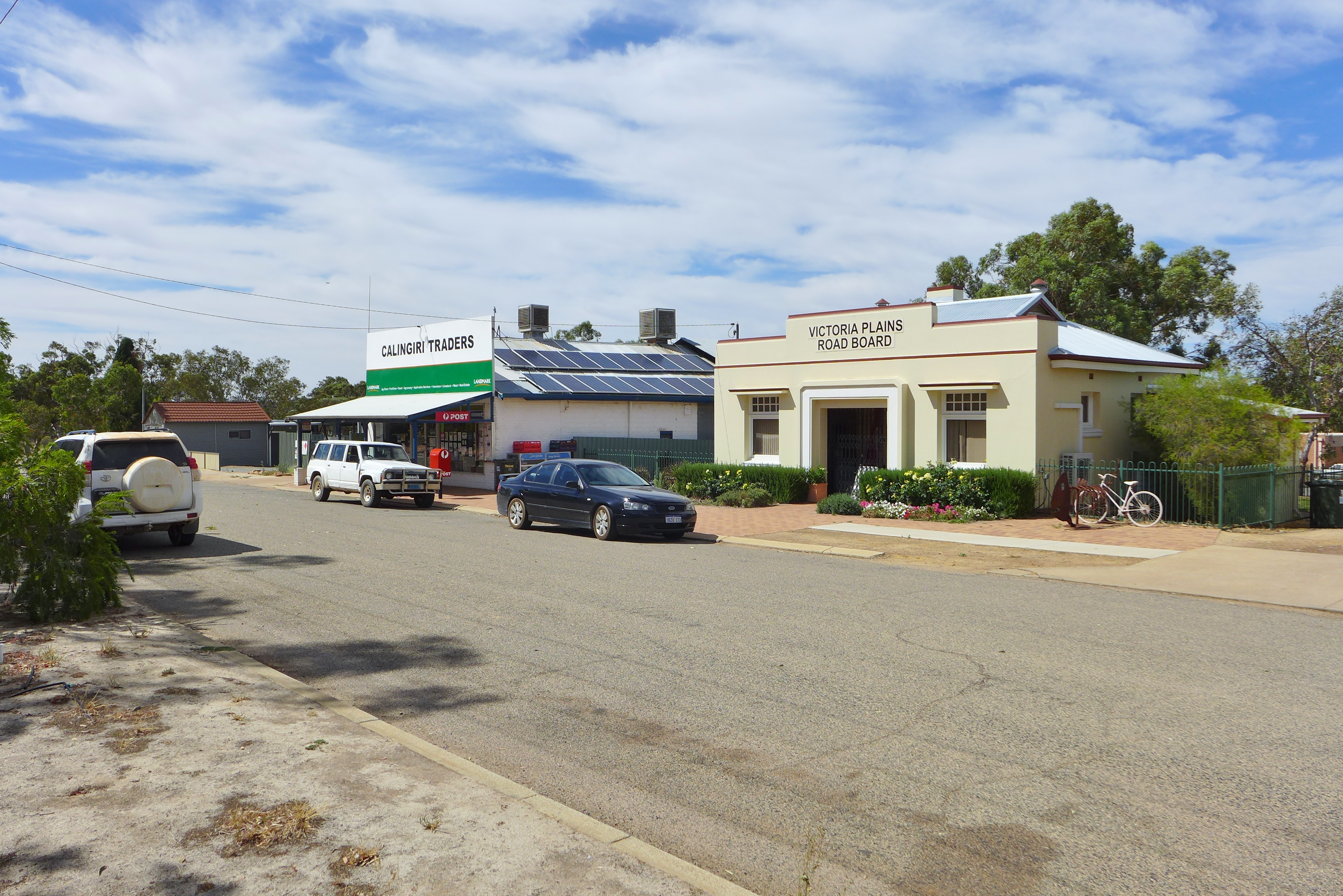
- Cavell Street, Calingiri, 2014

- Interactive map of Calingiri
- Coordinates: 31.088°S 116.453°E
- Country: Australia
- State: Western Australia
- LGA: Shire of Victoria Plains
- Location: 143 km (89 mi) NNE of Perth; 34 km (21 mi) SW of Wongan Hills; 66 km (41 mi) SE of Moora
- Established: 1917

Government
  - State electorate: Moore
  - Federal division: Durack

Area
  - Total: 196.9 km^{2} (76.0 sq mi)
- Elevation: 258 m (846 ft)

Population
  - Total: 198 (SAL 2021)
- Postcode: 6569

Calingiri is a town located north-east of Perth, near New Norcia in Western Australia. It is in the Shire of Victoria Plains.

The town derives its name from Calingiri Waterhole, the name of which was first recorded by a surveyor in 1903. The settlement was first proposed in 1914. By the time the town was gazetted in 1917 it was variously spelt as Calingtry, Kalingiri, The Washpool, Kalingary, Calingarra, Calingtry, Calingiry, Kalingiry and finally Calingiri.

The main industry in town is wheat farming with the town being a Cooperative Bulk Handling grain receival site.

== The Calingiri earthquake, March 1970 ==
The Calingiri earthquake of March 1970 was at the time one of only five known Australian recorded earthquakes to cause surface faulting. It was thought to be related to the 1968 Meckering earthquake, but a direct connection was not made at the time.

Date of occurrence: 10 March 1970
Time: 17:15 UTC (03:15 local time)
Latitude: 31.11 South (+/- 10 km)
Longitude: 116.46 East (+/- 10 km)
Magnitude: 5.9
Intensity: VI (Strong)

== Environment ==
An 800 km^{2} (310 sq mi) tract of land around the town has been classified as an Important Bird Area because it supports up to 20 breeding pairs of the endangered Carnaby's black cockatoo.

One of the local reserves near the Calingiri townsite was named after Rica Erickson.

== See also ==
- Earthquakes in Western Australia
