= Ivan Carnaby =

Australian ornithologist

Ivan Clarence Carnaby (24 July 1908 – 1974) was an Australian farmer, naturalist and ornithologist. He was born in Subiaco, Western Australia. He published many papers on Southwest Australian birdlife in Emu, The Western Australian Naturalist and Western Australian Bird Notes. He also made several botanical collecting journeys with Henry Steedman. He is commemorated in one of the common names of Carnaby's cockatoo, also known as the short-billed black cockatoo, which he described in 1948. Carnaby first suggested the existence of more than one kind of white-tailed black-cockatoo in the 1930s, something later confirmed by research.
