= Koobabbie Important Bird Area =

Coordinates: 29°57′03″S 116°12′31″E

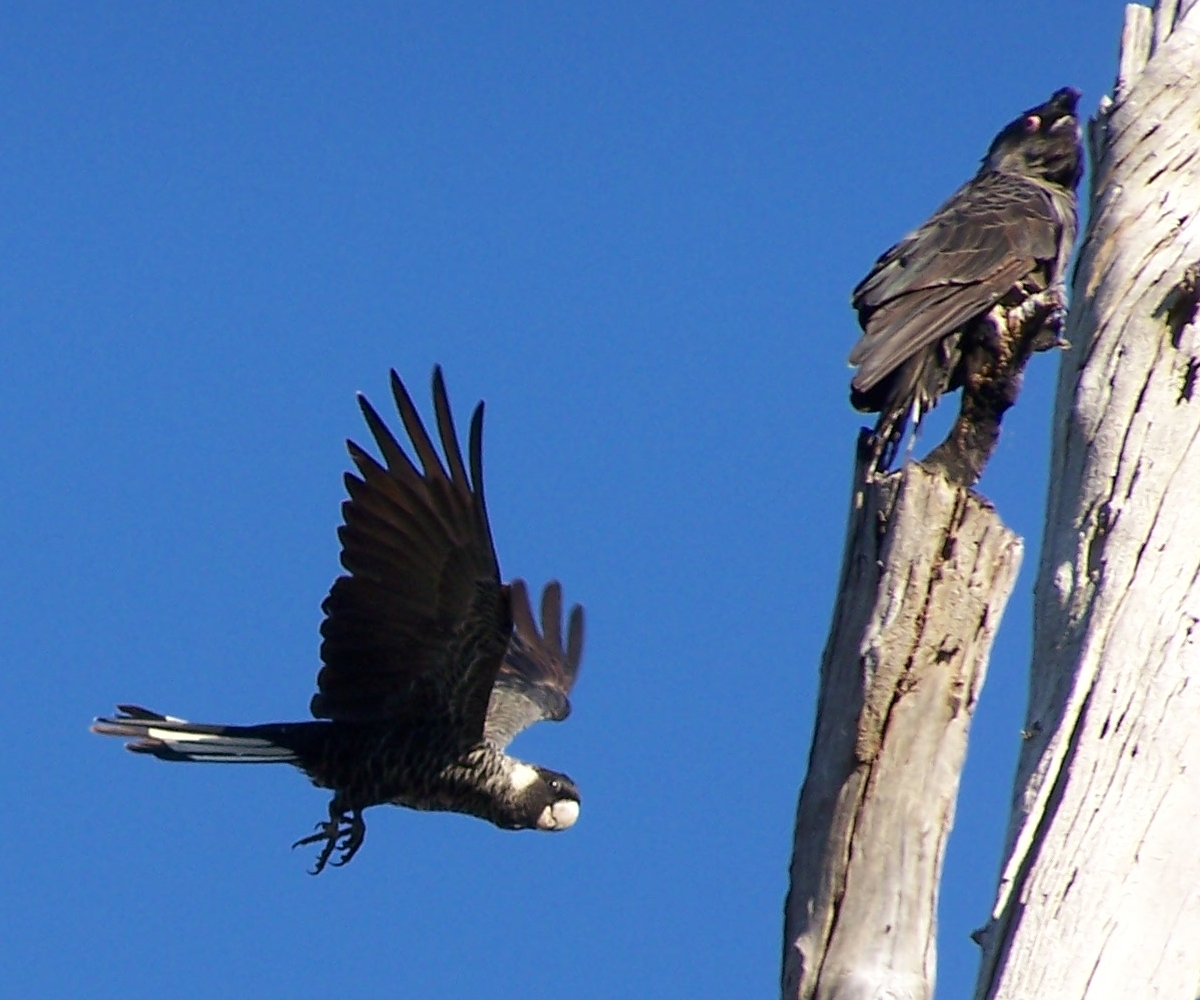
The IBA is an important area for Carnaby's cockatoos

The Koobabbie Important Bird Area comprises several disjunct, mostly linear, patches of land with a collective area of 254 ha. It lies in the northern wheatbelt region of Western Australia, about 20 km south-east of Coorow. It consists of remnant salmon gum woodlands on the Koobabbie farming property that provide the nesting habitat of large tree hollows necessary for breeding cockatoos.

== Birds ==
The site has been identified by BirdLife International as an Important Bird Area (IBA) because it supports up to 32 nesting pairs, over 1% of the breeding population, of the endangered Carnaby's cockatoo. It also supports populations of western corellas, regent parrots and blue-breasted fairywrens. Malleefowl and bustards have been observed in the IBA though they are not resident there.
