= Walebing Important Bird Area =

Important Bird Area in Western Australia

Coordinates: 30°41′37″S 116°15′29″E

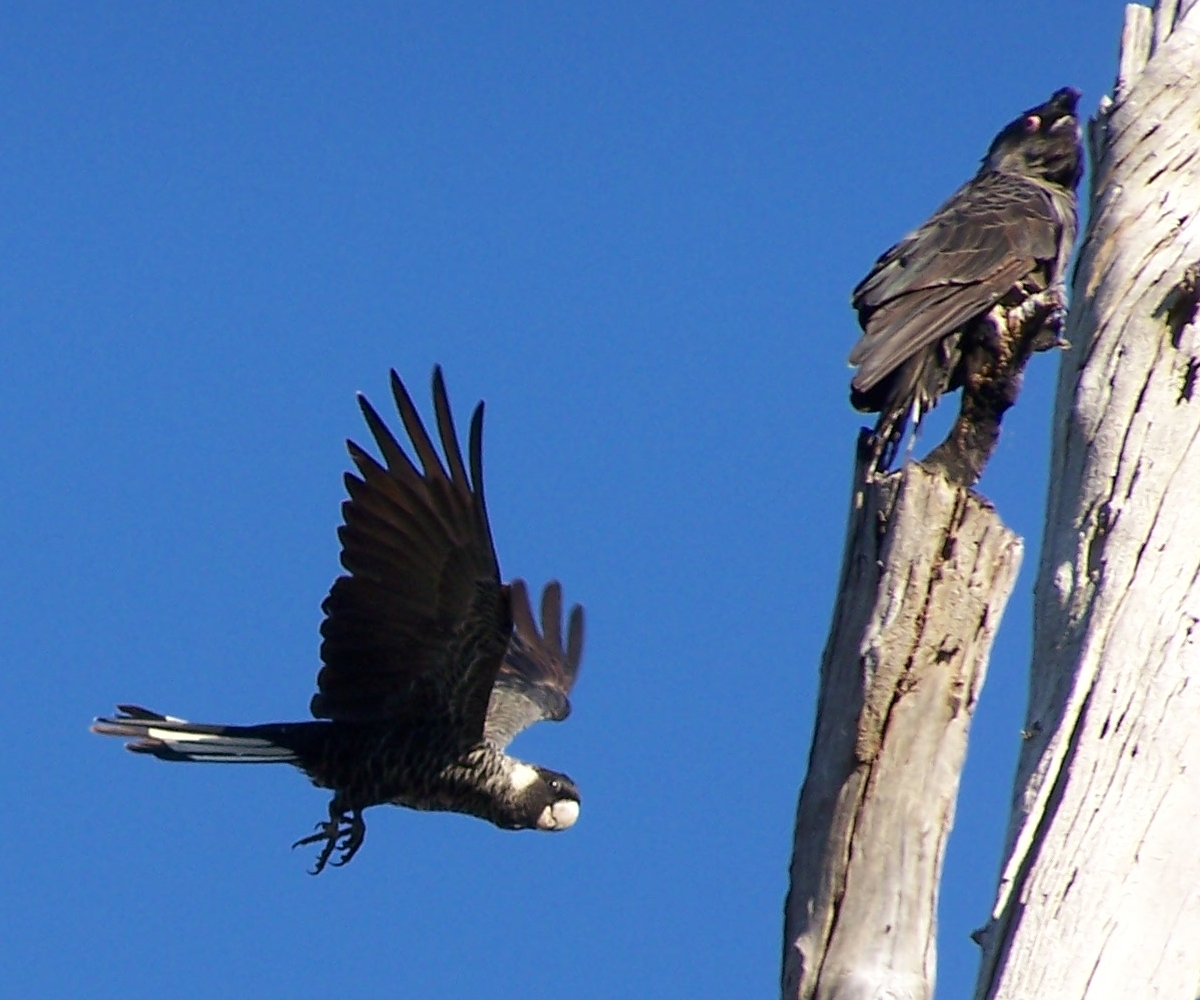
The site is important for short-billed black cockatoos

The Walebing Important Bird Area comprises a 13 km^{2} tract of land in the vicinity of the rural township of Walebing, in the northern wheatbelt region of south-west Western Australia.

== Description ==
The Important Bird Area (IBA) contains nesting trees suitable for black cockatoos on two private properties. It is defined by several fragments of remnant native vegetation, including small clusters and isolated large trees, but excludes areas of pasture, crops and non-native plants. It has a Mediterranean climate.

== Birds ==
The site has been identified as an IBA by BirdLife International because it supports up to 40 breeding pairs of endangered short-billed black cockatoos which nest in woodland remnants and isolated trees and feed in native shrublands. It also supports western corellas, regent parrots, rufous treecreepers and blue-breasted fairywrens.
