= Moora Important Bird Area =

Important Bird Area in Western Australia

Coordinates: 30°38′44″S 116°00′26″E

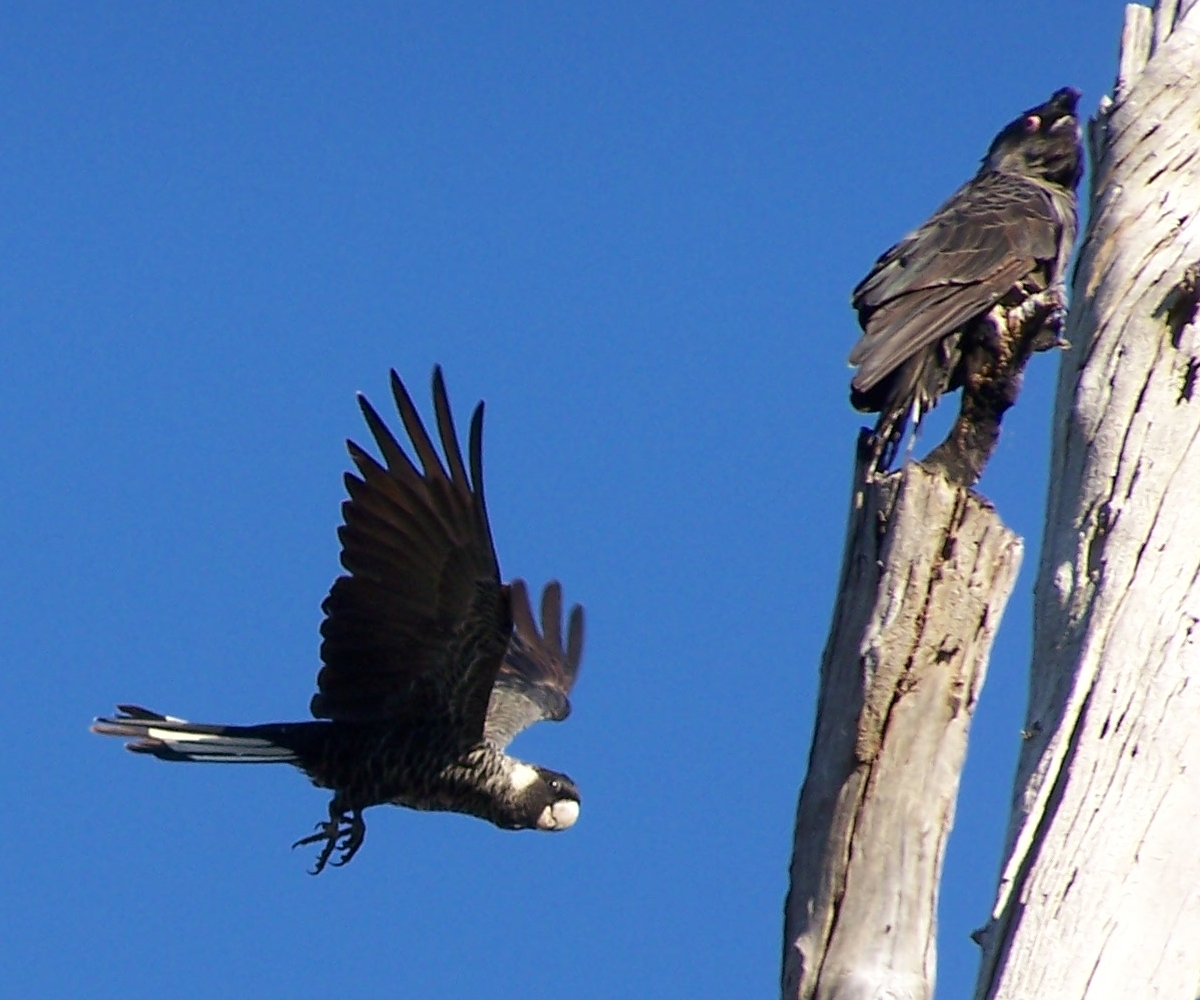
The site is important for short-billed black cockatoos

Moora Important Bird Area comprises a fragmented area of 685 ha centred on the rural township of Moora, in the wheatbelt region of south-west Western Australia. It lies about 175 km north of Perth. Most of the site is private land.

== Birds ==
The site has been identified by BirdLife International as an Important Bird Area (IBA) because it supports up to 60 breeding pairs of the endangered short-billed black cockatoo as well as a population of the restricted-range Western Corella. The site boundaries are defined by areas of suitable nesting habitat for the cockatoos along two road reserves and within Moora.
