= East Borden Important Bird Area =

Important Bird Area in Western Australia

Coordinates: 34°15′00″S 118°30′03″E

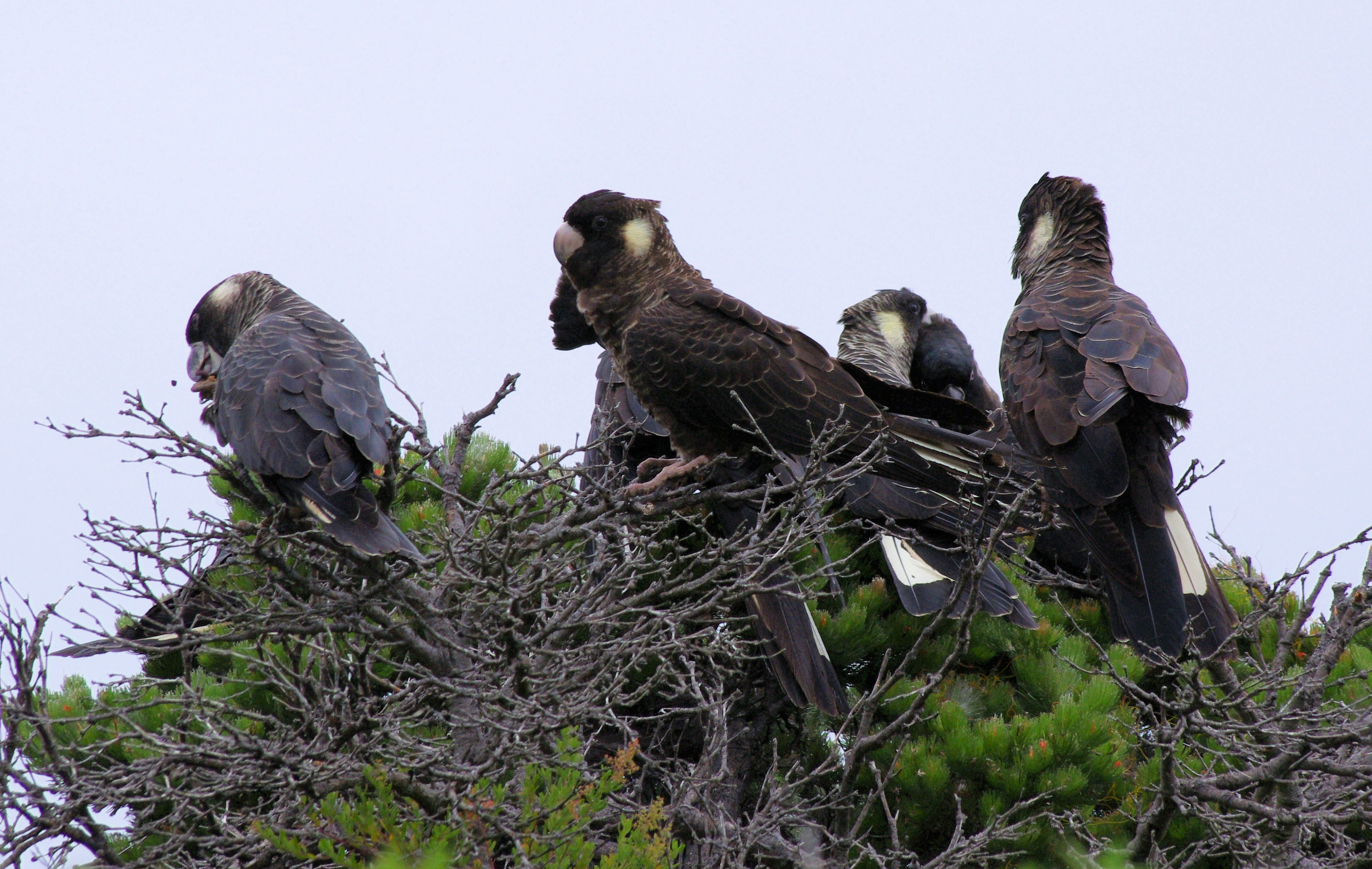
The IBA is an important breeding site for Carnaby's Cockatoos

The East Borden Important Bird Area consists of a cluster of patches of remnant native vegetation, totalling 459 ha and surrounded by farmland, in the Great Southern region of Western Australia. It has been identified as an Important Bird Area by BirdLife International because it supports at least 20 breeding pairs of the endangered Carnaby's black cockatoo which nest in tree hollows within the remnant woodland and feed in native shrublands.
