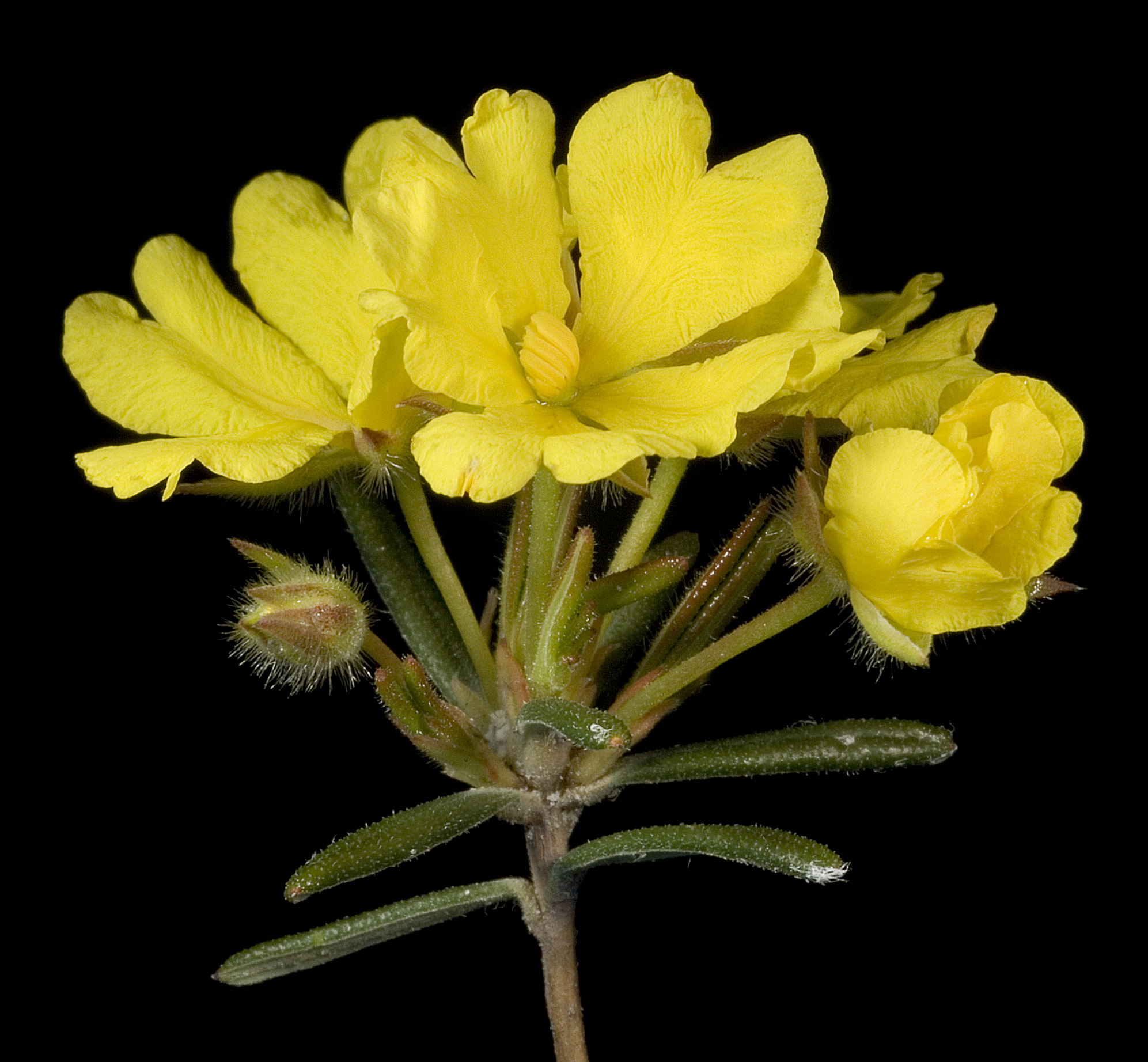

Scientific classification
- Kingdom: Plantae
- Clade: Tracheophytes
- Clade: Angiosperms
- Clade: Eudicots
- Order: Dilleniales
- Family: Dilleniaceae
- Genus: Hibbertia
- Species: H. fasciculiflora

Binomial name
- Hibbertia fasciculiflora K.R.Thiele

= Hibbertia fasciculiflora =

Species of flowering plant

Hibbertia fasciculiflora is a species of flowering plant in the family Dilleniaceae and is endemic to the south-west of Western Australia. It is an erect to spreading shrub with linear to narrow oblong leaves arranged in dense bunches near the ends of branchlets, and yellow flowers borne among the leaf bundles with eight to ten stamens all on one side of the two carpels.

== Description ==
Hibbertia fasciculiflora is usually an erect to spreading shrub that typically grows to a height of 50 cm (20 in). The leaves are linear to narrow oblong, 12–20 mm (0.47–0.79 in) long and 1.5–2.0 mm (0.059–0.079 in) wide and arranged in dense clusters near the end of the branchlets. The flowers are borne among the leaf bundles on thin peduncles 10–35 mm (0.39–1.38 in) long with narrow triangular to narrow egg-shaped bracts 4.0–5.5 mm (0.16–0.22 in) long. The five sepals are egg-shaped, the outer sepals 5.0–6.5 mm (0.20–0.26 in) long, the inner sepals shorter and broader. The five petals are yellow, egg-shaped with the narrower end towards the base, 8–12 mm (0.31–0.47 in) long. There are eight to ten stamens all on one side of the two carpels with one or two staminodes either side of the stamens. The carpels are densely hairy and there are two ovules per carpel. Flowering has been recorded in September.

== Taxonomy ==
Hibbertia fasciculiflora was first formally described in 2017 by Kevin Thiele in the journal Nuytsia from specimens he collected in Tathra National Park in 2008. The specific epithet (fasciculiflora) means "fascicle-flower" referring to the flowers borne among the leaf bundles.

== Distribution and habitat ==
This species grows in low, open woodland and kwongan, mostly in the Tathra and Alexander Morrison National Parks in the Geraldton Sandplains biogeographic region in the south-west of Western Australia.

== Conservation status ==
Hibbertia fasciculiflora is classified as "not threatened" by the Government of Western Australia Department of Parks and Wildlife.

== See also ==
- List of Hibbertia species
