= Calingiri Important Bird Area =

Important Bird Area in Western Australia

Coordinates: 31°03′42″S 116°29′50″E

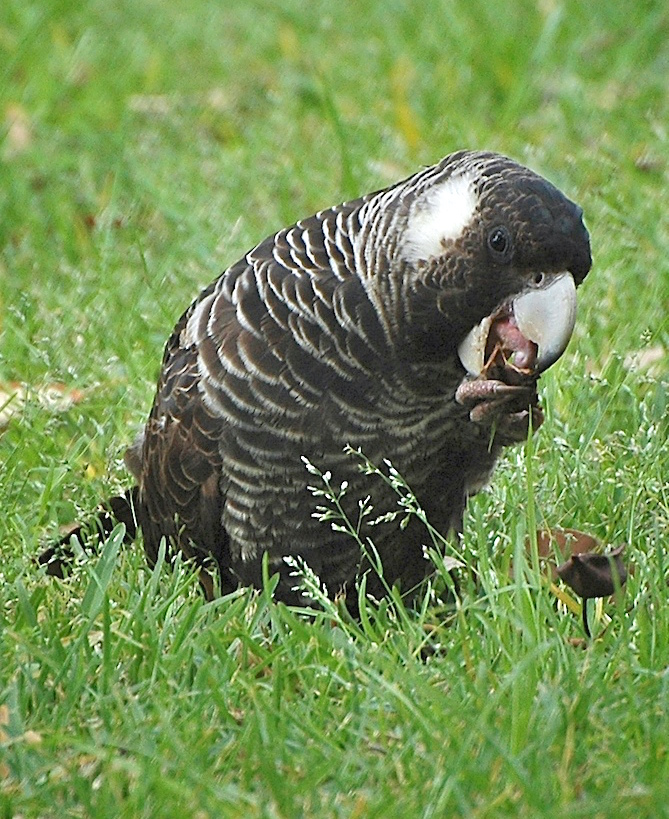
Calingiri IBA holds important breeding habitat of Carnaby's black-cockatoo

Calingiri Important Bird Area is an 807 km^{2} tract of land roughly centred on the town of Calingiri in the Wheatbelt region of Western Australia. It lies about 120 km north-east of Perth. It has been classified by BirdLife International as an Important Bird Area because it supports up to 20 breeding pairs of short-billed black cockatoo, an endangered species that nests in remnant patches of eucalypt woodland and isolated paddock trees, and feeds in native shrublands. The area also supports the restricted-range western corella and a globally important population of the western yellow robin.
