= Yanchep National Park =

National park in Western Australia

- IUCN category II (national park)
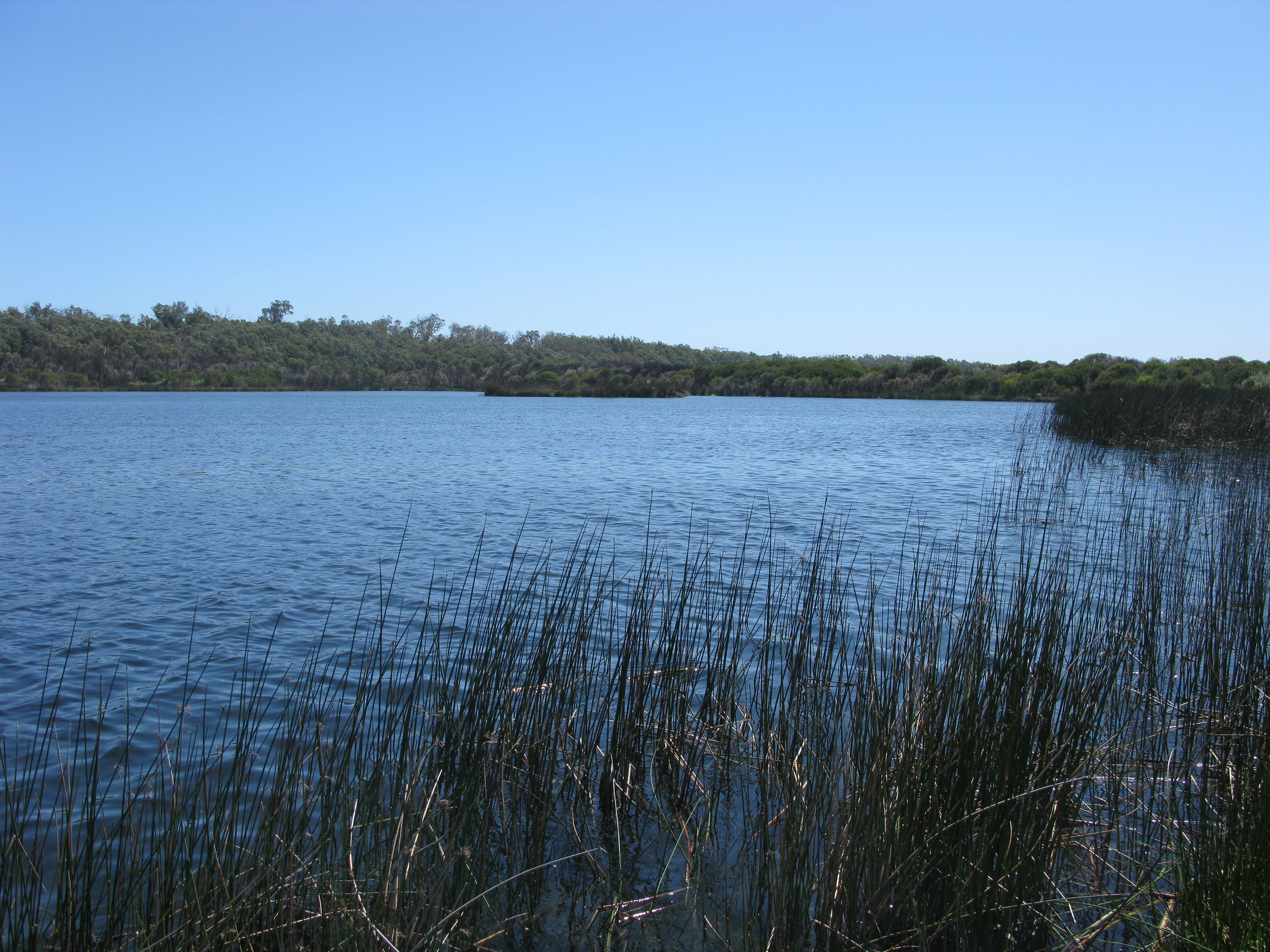
- Loch McNess at Yanchep National Park

- Location within Western Australia
- Location: Western Australia
- Nearest city: Perth
- Coordinates: 31°33′38″S 115°41′27″E
- Area: 28.76 km^{2} (11.10 sq mi)
- Established: 1957
- Governing body: Department of Parks and Wildlife
- Website: Official website

Western Australia Heritage Register
- Type: State Registered Place
- Designated: 17 February 2006
- Reference no.: 4151

Yanchep is a national park in Western Australia, 42 kilometres (26 mi) north of Perth adjacent to the locality of the same name Yanchep.

The park is noted for its caves, native bush and koala colonies. It also offers cultural educational programmes offered in partnership with the local Nyoongar people.

== History ==
The area was inhabited and was a noted hunting site for thousands of years by Indigenous Australians prior to the arrival of Europeans. The tribal name for the park is Nyanyi-Yandjip named after the reeds and lake which were thought to resemble the hairy mane of the dreamtime creature the Waugul.

The word Yanchep is derived from Yandjip or Yanget which is the aboriginal name for the local bulrush reed found fringing the lakes in the area.

The first European visitor arrived in 1834 when John Butler, a farmer, came in search of his lost cattle and noted the presence of the lakes, wetlands and plentiful game. While in the area Butler was greeted by the men of the Yellagonga peoples who inhabited the area. Lieutenant George Grey travelled through the area in 1838 and made note of the remarkable caves he found in the area.

Surveyor John Septimus Roe and Governor John Hutt visited the caves in the park in 1841.

A road survey was conducted near Loch McNess in 1862 and later in 1865 a stock route was built through the area that was later used by drovers.

The first settler to arrive in the area was Henry White who arrived in 1901 and built his house near the north west shore of Yonderup Lake, he was later appointed as a caretaker and guide in 1903.

== Flora and fauna ==
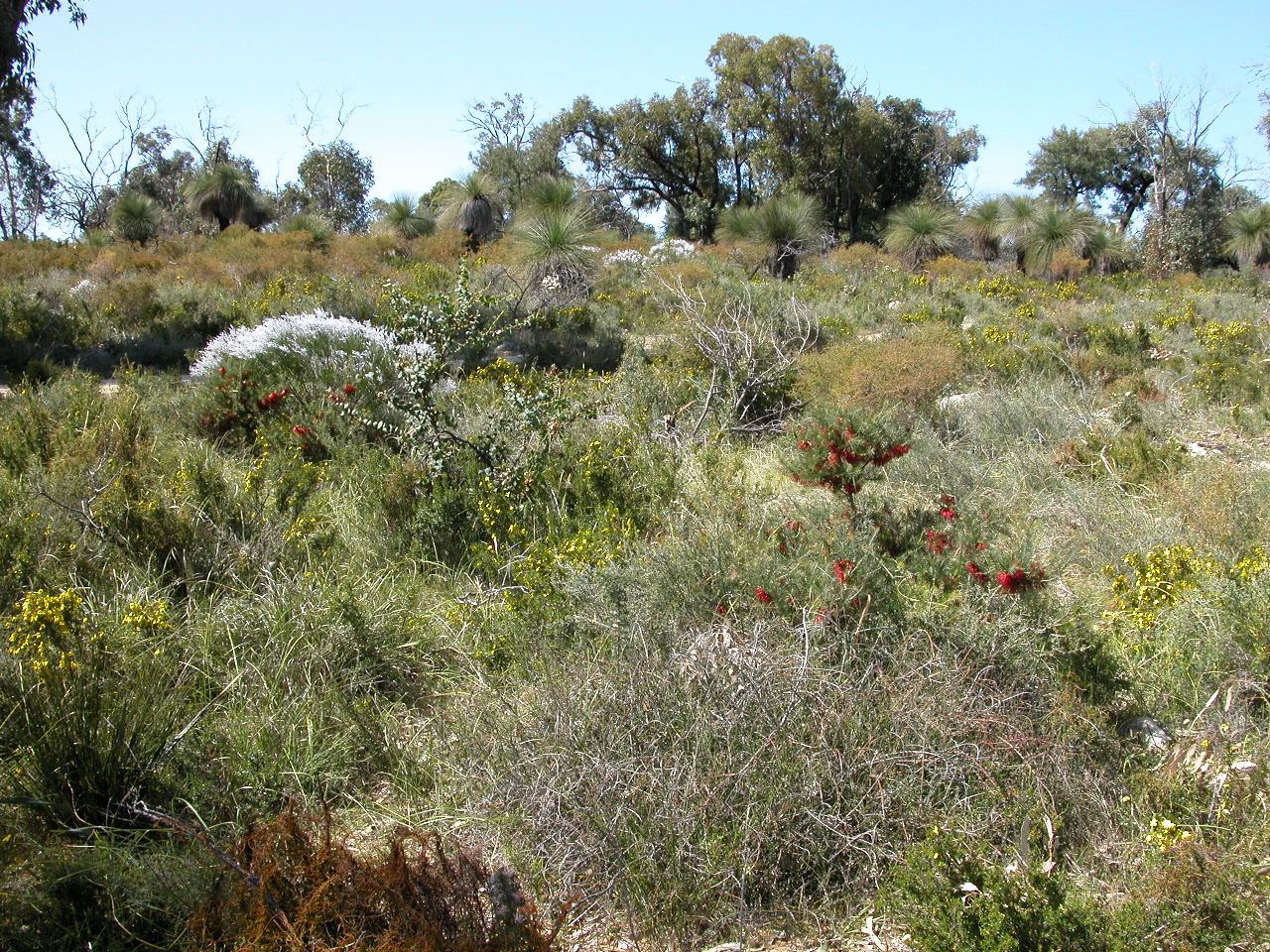
Wildflowers in September

The park is home to a diverse range of flora and fauna. Trees such as banksias, paperbark, tuart, marri, she-oak and stunted jarrah are found in the woodland areas. Wildflowers including parrot bush, yanchep rose, catspaw and kangaroo paw are also found.

The park provides habitat for several species of native mammal, including the quenda, western grey kangaroo and black-glove wallaby. It lies within the Northern Swan Coastal Plain Important Bird Area, so identified by BirdLife International because of its importance in supporting several thousand short-billed black cockatoos during the non-breeding season.

== Activities ==
Yanchep National Park is open year-round and offers a variety of nature-based activities for visitors. For visitors there is an entry-fee for all vehicles entering the national park that must be paid.

=== Walking trails ===
Yanchep National Park has nine marked trail walks that cater for different abilities and levels. Walks range from family-friendly short trails of 500m to challenging trails up to 46.2 km. Each trail showcases the unique biodiversity of the northern Swan Coastal Plain.

=== Wangi Mia Aboriginal Experience ===
The Wangi Mia Aboriginal Experience is available as a public tour on Sunday and public holidays. Wangi Mia offers opportunities to explore more about the local Noongar culture.

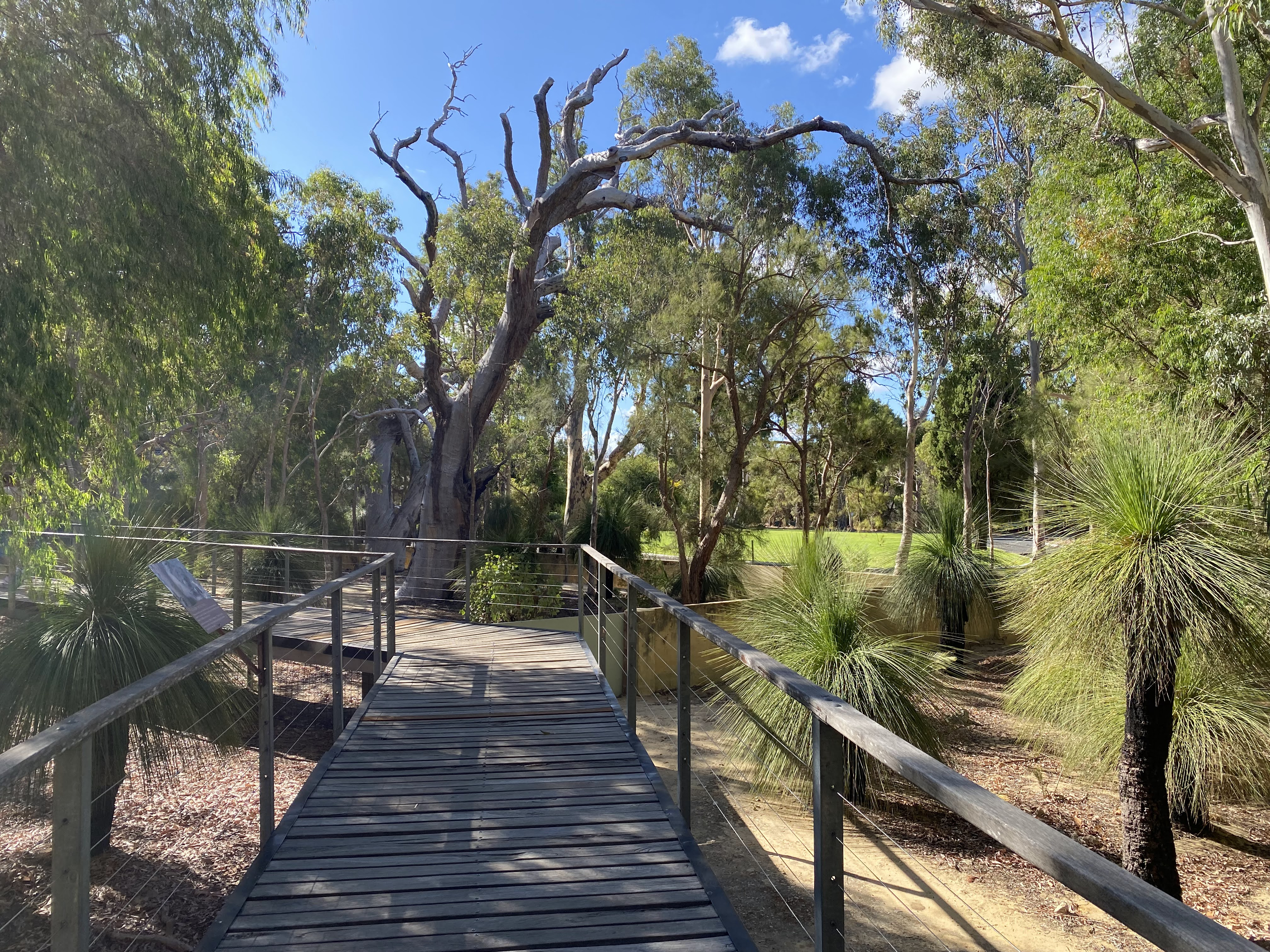
The Koala Boardwalk

=== Koala Boardwalk ===
Yanchep National Park is home to a colony of Koalas. These can be viewed on the 140-metre-long Koala Park that allows close-up views of the koalas. There are also daily talks providing more information about koalas and their habitat.

=== Picnic and barbecue areas ===
Yanchep National Park has many picnic and barbeque areas. There are gas barbeques available free of charge along with wooden tables and benches.

=== Trees Adventure Yanchep Park ===
The Trees Adventure Park has seven adventure courses suitable for different abilities. Each course consists of rope and zipline challenges. The adventure park is suitable for children aged 4+.

=== Restaurant and tea rooms ===
Chocolate Drops Tea Rooms is located next to the visitor's centre and serves simple homemade food, including sandwiches, muffins and homemade chocolate. The Yanchep Inn is a fully licensed restaurant open 7 days a week and serves breakfast, lunch and dinner.

== Caves ==
Yanchep National Park contains over 570 caves. They were formed by underground streams flowing westward from the Gnangara Mound through Tamala Limestone. Currently, Crystal Cave, Yonderup Cave, and Cabaret Cave are the only caves currently open to the public, although in the past, additional caves have been made accessible to visitors.

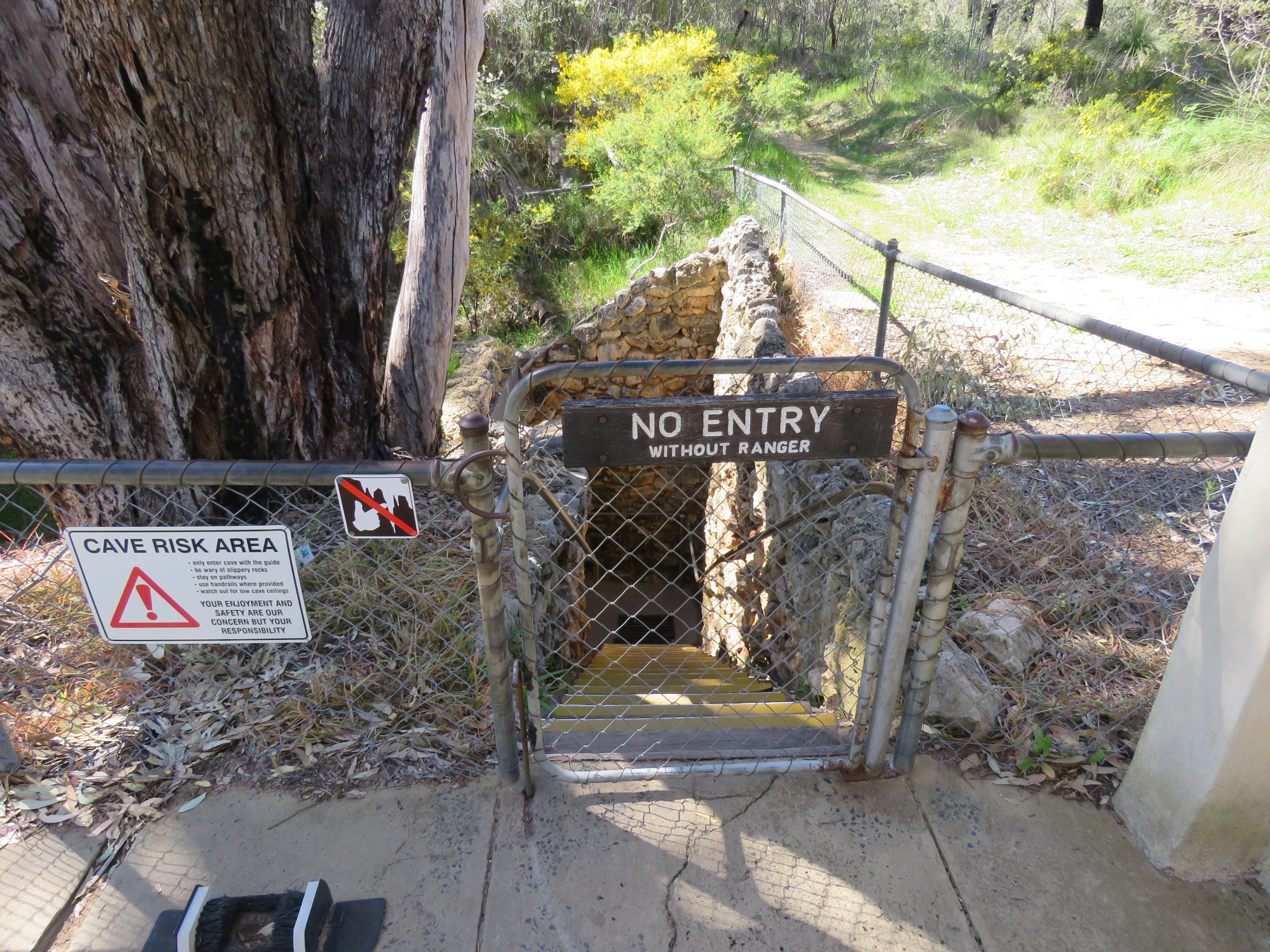
The entrance to Crystal Cave in September 2021

=== Crystal Cave ===
Crystal Cave was discovered by Henry White in 1903 and is the only tourist cave in Perth. Crystal Cave can be visited on guided tours departing four times daily from the Visitors Center.

=== Yonderup Cave ===
Yonderup Cave was discovered in 1903 by L. Ramaciotti, C. Conigeave and H. Kent. Unlike Crystal Cave (a tourist cave), Yonderup Cave is classified as an adventure cave, where visitors are guided through the relatively untouched environment with a hard hat and a headtorch. Tours must be prebooked online.

=== Cabaret Cave ===
Cabaret Cave, initially called Milligan's Cave (later renamed Ballroom Cave and later still Silver Stocking Cabaret Cave) was discovered by Henry White in 1902. In 1932, it was developed into an underground function centre where the cave's two main chambers were converted into a supper room and a ballroom. Currently, the cave is available for hire for function and events, accommodating between 120-200 guests.

== See also ==
- Protected areas of Western Australia
