= Moora, Western Australia =

Town in the Wheatbelt region of Western Australia

Coordinates: 30°38′17″S 116°00′36″E

Moora
- Town
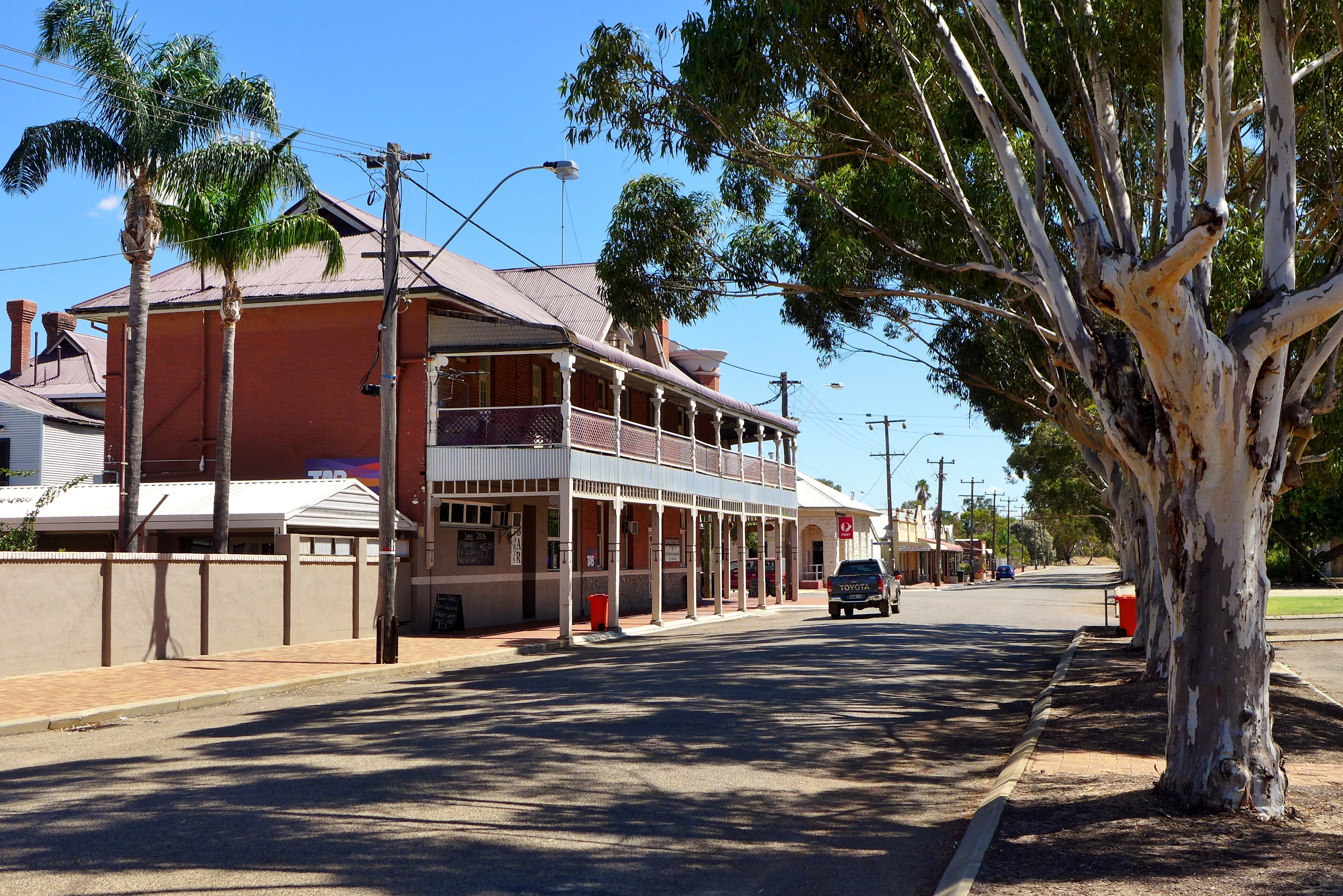
- Moora, Western Australia
- Interactive map of Moora
- Country: Australia
- State: Western Australia
- LGA: Shire of Moora
- Location: 177 km (110 mi) N of Perth; 279 km (173 mi) SE of Geraldton; 119 km (74 mi) SE of Jurien Bay
- Established: 1895

Government
  - State electorate: Moore
  - Federal division: Durack

Area
  - Total: 361 km^{2} (139 sq mi)
- Elevation: 203 m (666 ft)

Population
  - Total: 1,591 (UCL 2021)
- Postcode: 6510
- Mean max temp: 25.6 °C (78.1 °F)
- Mean min temp: 12.0 °C (53.6 °F)
- Annual rainfall: 459.2 mm (18.08 in)

Moora is a townsite located 177 km north of Perth in the Wheatbelt region of Western Australia. At the 2021 census, Moora had a population of 1,591.

== History ==
Moora was one of the original stations on the Midland railway line to Walkaway, and the townsite was gazetted in 1895.

=== Natural disasters ===
The town was left underwater in 1932 when heavy rainfall inundated the town, causing severe flooding. The town was left isolated as both rail lines and roads had portions washed away. Over half the town was submerged to a depth of 3 feet (90 cm), and once the waters receded, was left under a thick coating of mud. Crops and stock in the surrounding area were also lost.

In March 1999, the town suffered a major flood when ex-Tropical Cyclone Elaine caused the Moore River to break its banks, with 1000 people evacuated. Just as the community was recovering, another major rainfall event on the already saturated land in May of the same year caused yet another flood in the town.

== Economy ==
The town is the largest wheat belt town between Geraldton and Perth, and the third largest overall after the coastal settlements of Dongara and Jurien Bay. The town provides facilities and services such as commercial banks, schools, commerce and retail sectors, community recreational facilities; plus a pharmacy, dentist, doctors and district hospital.

Surrounding the town are several rural activities such as the growing of wheat, barley, canola, oaten hay and lupins, as well as the raising of sheep, cattle and pigs. A silica mine is located 15 km north of the townsite. The town is a receival site for Cooperative Bulk Handling.

== Education ==
Moora is home to the Central Midlands Senior High School, Moora Primary School and St Joseph's School (SJSM)—a Catholic private co-educational primary school.

== Attractions ==
The Moora Agricultural Show is held every year in September, and includes a full equestrian program, fireworks, fashion parade, entertainment and exhibits. The Moora Cup Race Day is one of the biggest events on Moora's social calendar and is held every year in October.

Many tourist attractions can be found around the Moora District, ranging from the Western Wildflower Farm to the abundance of hand-painted murals and the Moora Town Clock. As such, Moora is often a popular stopover for tourists en-route to holiday destinations and those following the wildflower trail.

In October 2026, a 11.5-metre tall sculpture of two Carnaby's black cockatoos was installed in the town. It is hoped the sculpture would both become a tourist drawcard and bring increased awareness of the endangered species.

== Environment ==
Moora lies within the Moora Important Bird Area, declared by BirdLife International because it supports up to 60 breeding pairs of the endangered Carnaby's Black Cockatoo.

=== Climate ===
Climate data for Moora
Month	Jan	Feb	Mar	Apr	May	Jun	Jul	Aug	Sep	Oct	Nov	Dec	Year
Record high °C (°F)	45.0 (113.0)	45.5 (113.9)	42.3 (108.1)	39.6 (103.3)	34.5 (94.1)	26.4 (79.5)	24.7 (76.5)	27.7 (81.9)	32.8 (91.0)	37.5 (99.5)	42.3 (108.1)	44.0 (111.2)	45.5 (113.9)
Mean daily maximum °C (°F)	34.4 (93.9)	34.1 (93.4)	31.0 (87.8)	26.4 (79.5)	21.9 (71.4)	18.7 (65.7)	17.3 (63.1)	17.9 (64.2)	20.6 (69.1)	24.5 (76.1)	28.5 (83.3)	32.0 (89.6)	25.6 (78.1)
Mean daily minimum °C (°F)	17.7 (63.9)	18.1 (64.6)	16.3 (61.3)	13.6 (56.5)	9.9 (49.8)	8.1 (46.6)	6.8 (44.2)	6.7 (44.1)	7.6 (45.7)	9.5 (49.1)	13.0 (55.4)	15.5 (59.9)	11.9 (53.4)
Record low °C (°F)	8.6 (47.5)	9.1 (48.4)	5.0 (41.0)	3.2 (37.8)	0.6 (33.1)	−1.4 (29.5)	−1.0 (30.2)	−1.1 (30.0)	0.0 (32.0)	0.0 (32.0)	3.9 (39.0)	7.4 (45.3)	−1.4 (29.5)
Average precipitation mm (inches)	11.0 (0.43)	14.3 (0.56)	19.8 (0.78)	25.4 (1.00)	60.9 (2.40)	90.0 (3.54)	88.6 (3.49)	63.8 (2.51)	38.6 (1.52)	24.9 (0.98)	12.8 (0.50)	9.6 (0.38)	459.1 (18.07)
Average precipitation days	2.2	2.4	3.2	5.8	10.3	14.3	15.6	13.5	10.3	7.4	4.1	2.4	91.5
Average relative humidity (%)	28	30	34	42	53	63	65	60	53	41	35	30	44

== Notable residents ==
Musician Paul Harding from electronic music group Pendulum attended Moora Primary School.

== Gallery ==
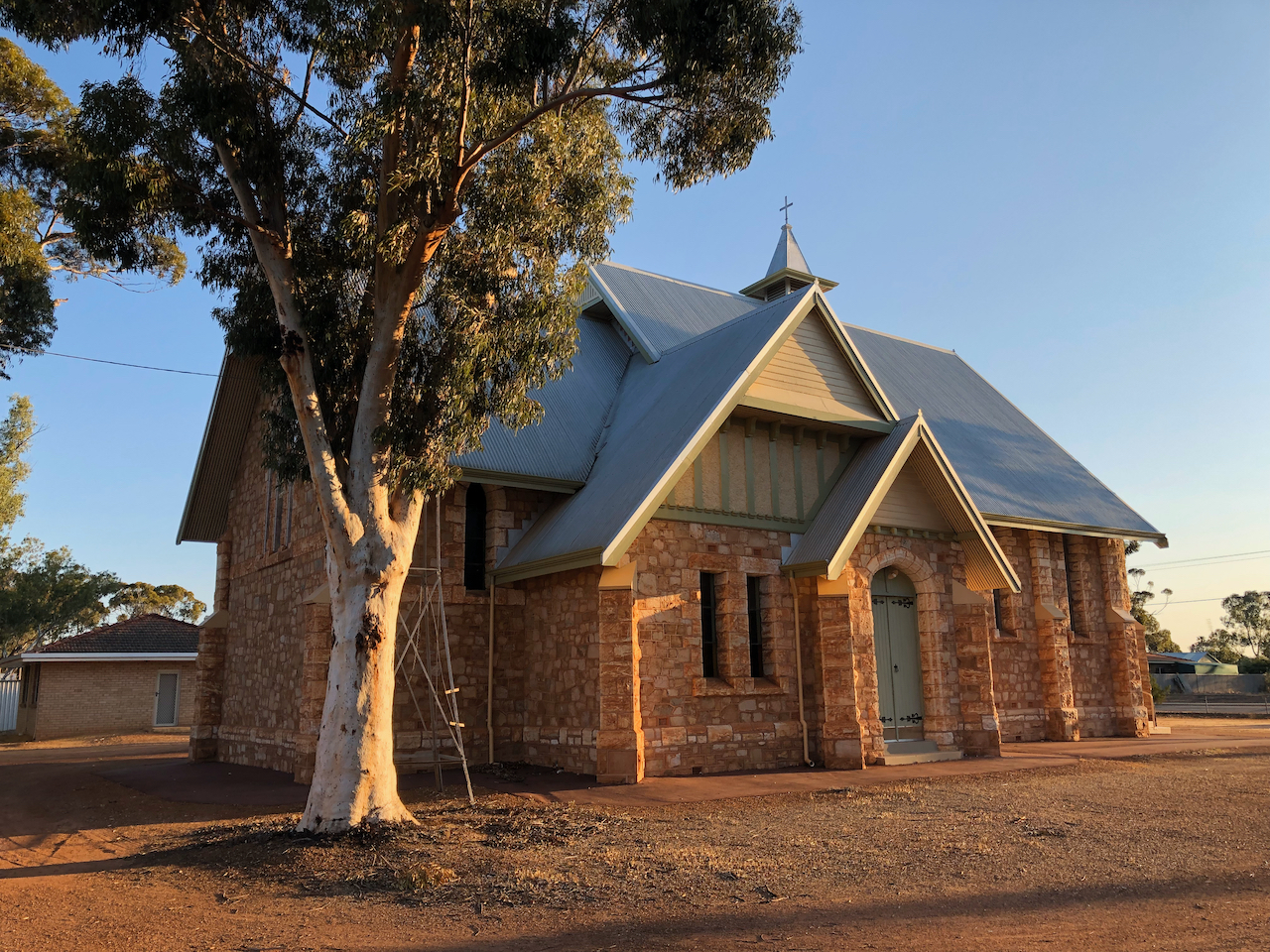
St James Anglican church

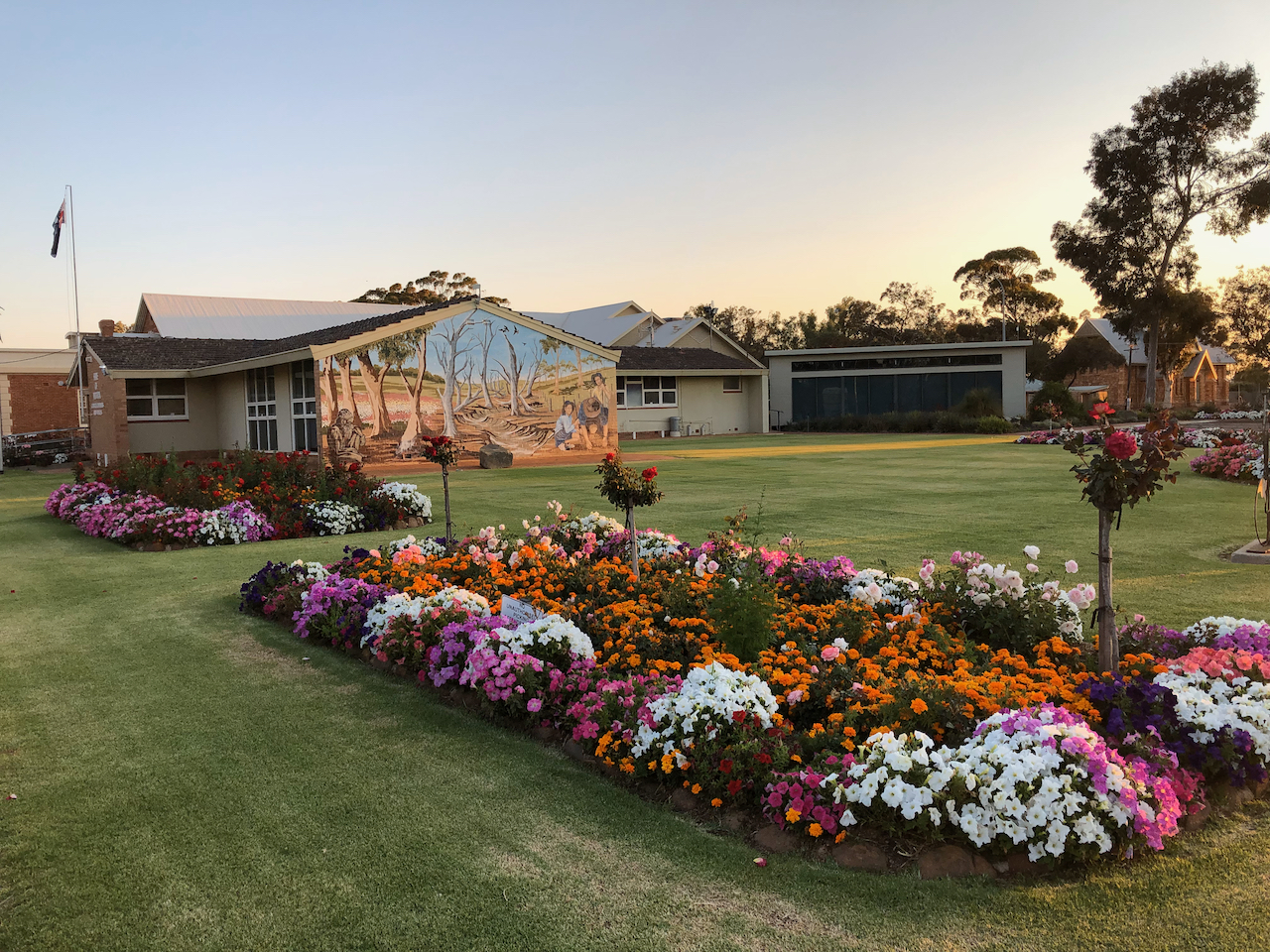
Shire council offices and garden

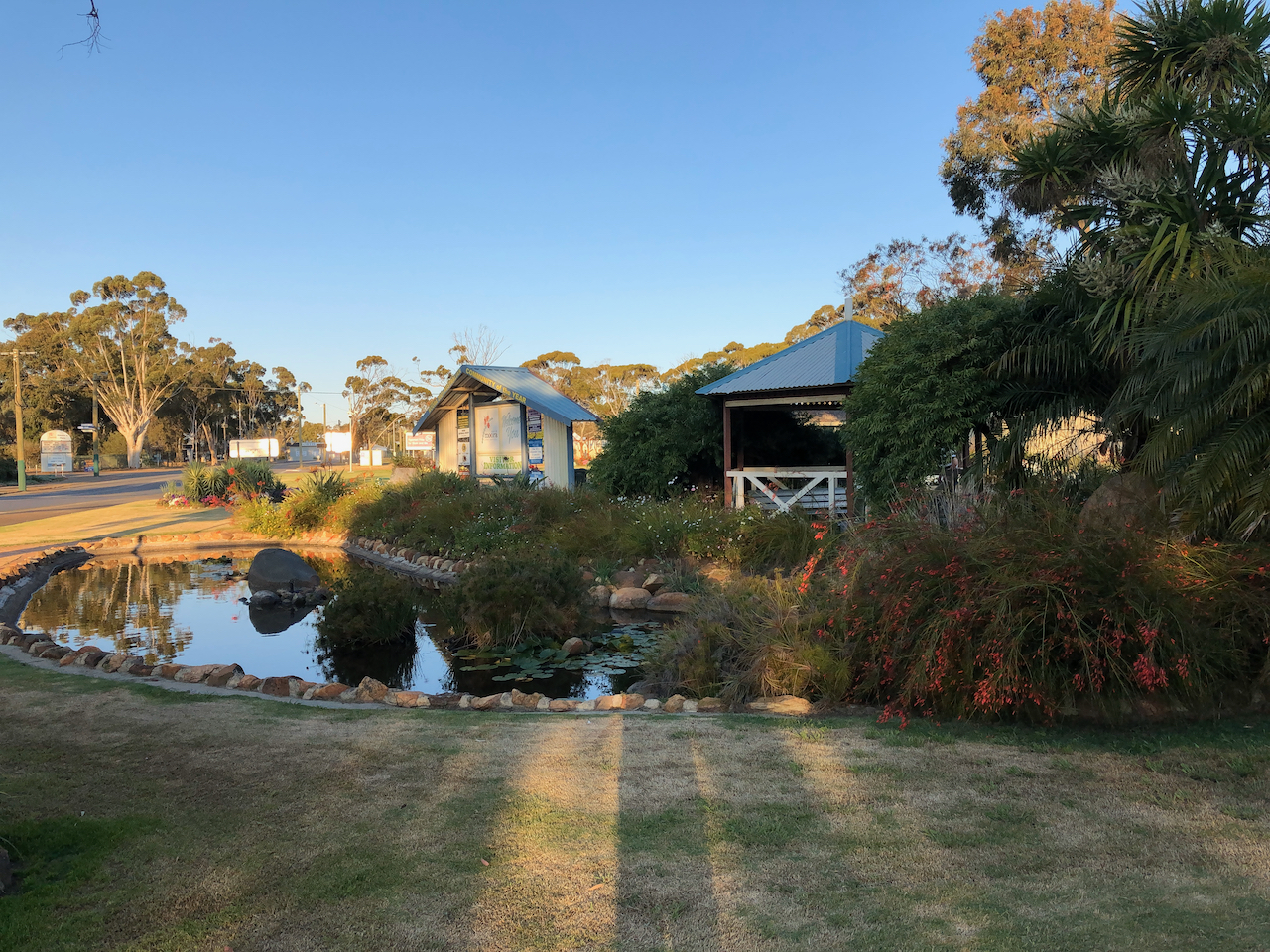
Visitors centre garden

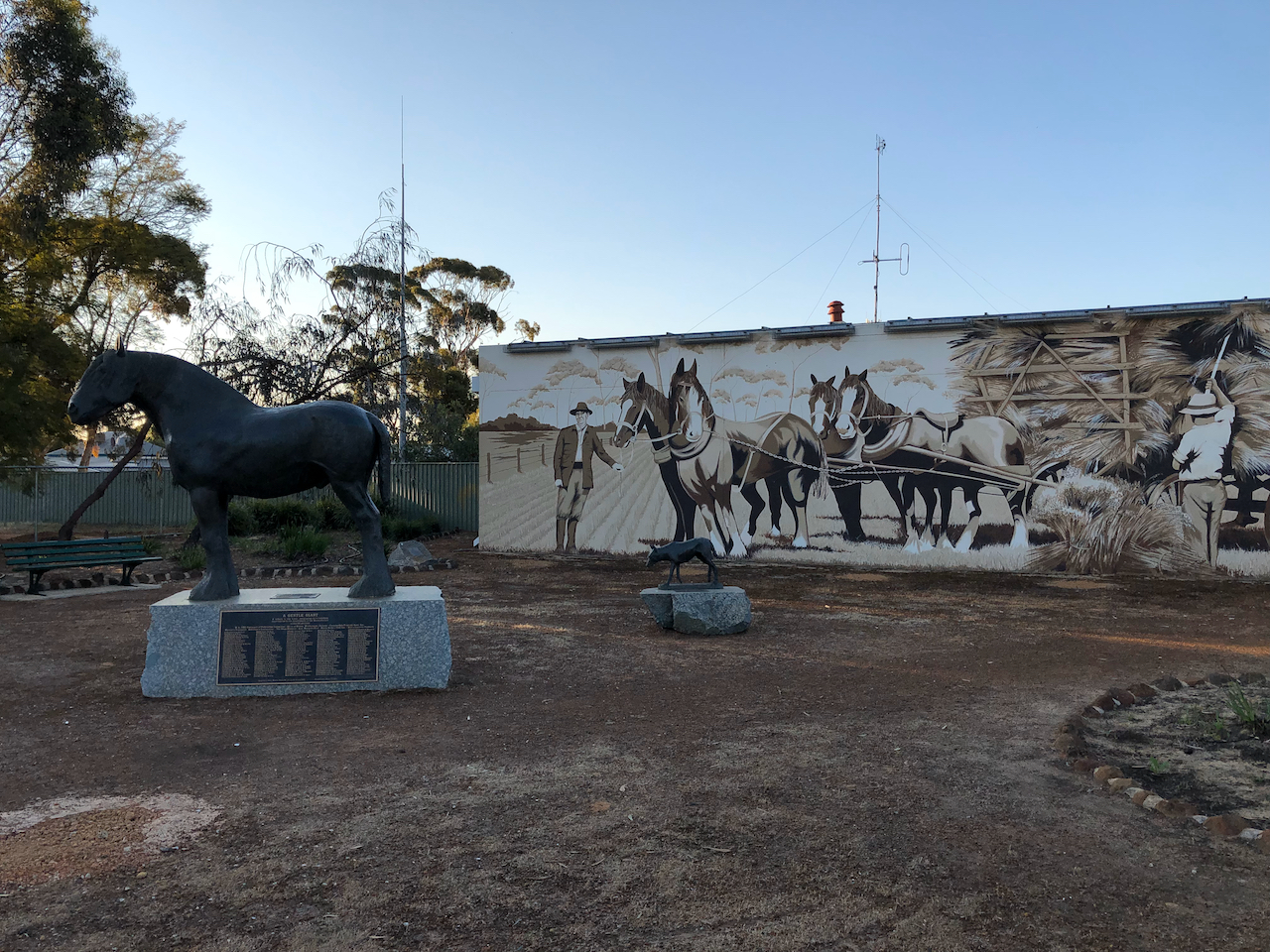
Australian Draughthorse Memorial

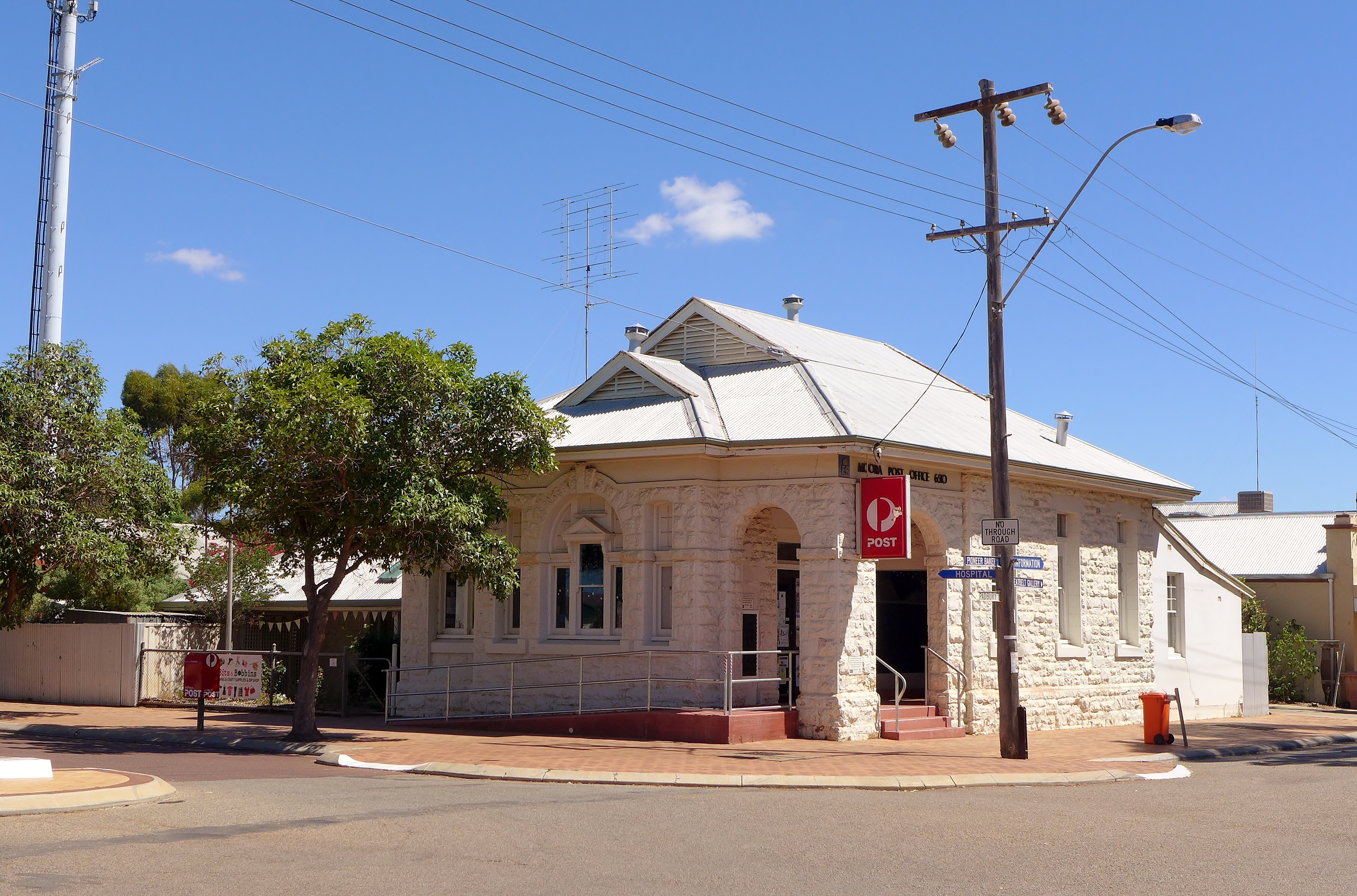
Moora post office
