= Northern Swan Coastal Plain Important Bird Area =

Important Bird Area in Western Australia

Coordinates: 31°36′28″S 115°48′54″E

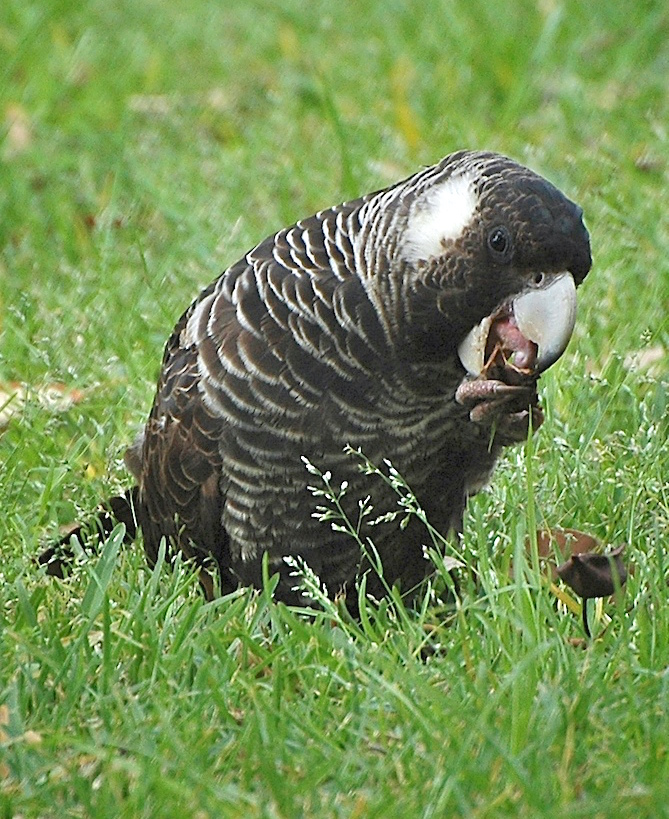
The area is very important for short-billed black cockatoos

The Northern Swan Coastal Plain Important Bird Area comprises a 2307 km^{2} tract of land in south-west Western Australia.

== Description ==
The Important Bird Area (IBA) stretches from the city of Perth northwards along the coast to the town of Guilderton, extending inland for about 40 km, thereby including much of the Swan Coastal Plain north of the Swan River. It is bounded by the Moore River in the north and the Darling Scarp in the east. It includes all native vegetation remnants greater than one hectare in area on private land, water catchments, state forests and nature reserves, including the Yanchep and Neerabup National Parks. The area has a Mediterranean climate.

== Birds ==
The site has been identified by BirdLife International as an IBA because it supports 4600–15,000 short-billed black cockatoos during their non-breeding season, with a small number of breeding birds, forming the largest population of non-breeding birds in Australia. The IBA also supports small populations of western corellas, red-capped parrots, western rosellas, western spinebills and western thornbills. Regent parrots, white-breasted and western yellow robins, and red-eared firetails have been occasionally recorded.
