= Coomallo Important Bird Area =

Important bird area in Western Australia

Coordinates: 30°11′28″S 115°28′22″E

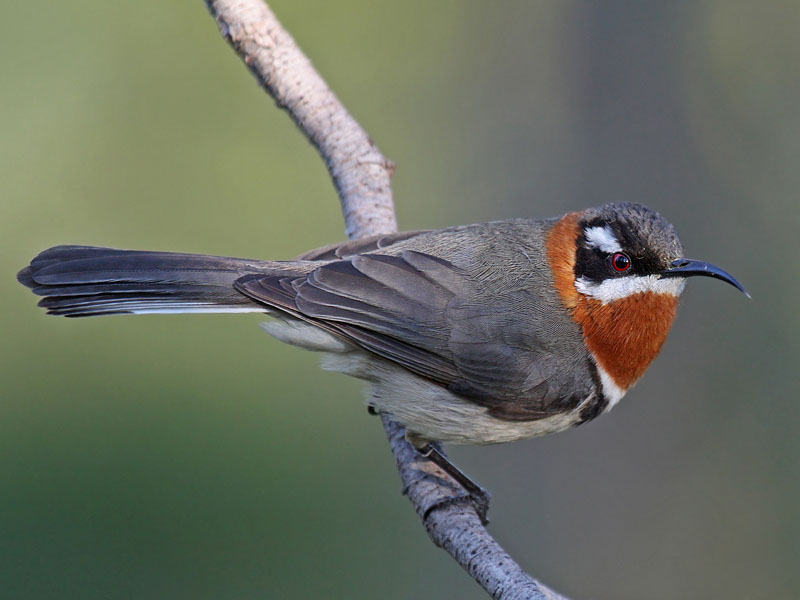
The IBA supports a globally important population of western spinebills

Coomallo Important Bird Area is a 21 km^{2} fragmented tract of land in the Wheatbelt region of Western Australia. The western section includes the eastern end of the Coomallo Nature Reserve, while the eastern section comprises several separated remnants of eucalypt woodland. It lies about 200 km north of Perth and 40 km east of coastal Jurien Bay. It was identified and classified by BirdLife International as an Important Bird Area (IBA) because it supports up to 40 breeding pairs of the endangered Carnaby's black-cockatoo which nest in large tree hollows in the woodlands and in isolated paddock trees, and feed in native shrublands. It also supports western corellas, regent parrots, rufous treecreepers, blue-breasted fairywrens and western spinebills.
