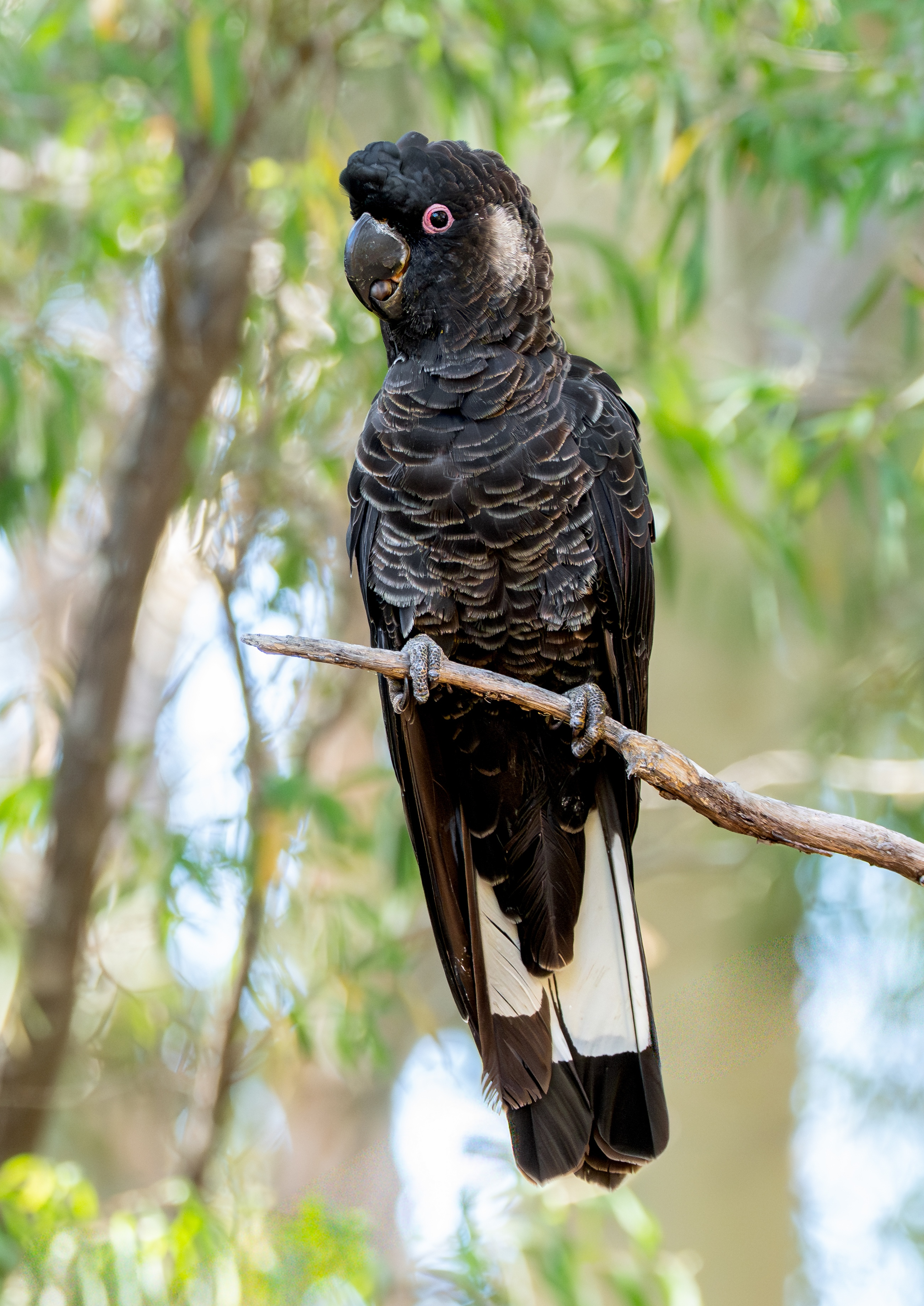
- Carnaby's black cockatoo (Male) at Yanchep National Park, Western Australia

Conservation status
- Endangered (IUCN 3.1)

Scientific classification
- Kingdom: Animalia
- Phylum: Chordata
- Class: Aves
- Order: Psittaciformes
- Family: Cacatuidae
- Genus: Zanda
- Species: Z. latirostris

Binomial name
- Zanda latirostris (Carnaby, 1948)
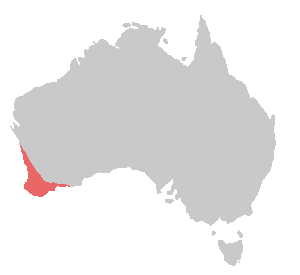
- Range in red

Synonyms
- Calyptorhynchus funereus latirostris Carnaby, 1948; Calyptorhynchus baudinii latirostris Carnaby, 1948; Calyptorhynchus latirostris Carnaby, 1948

= Carnaby's black cockatoo =

Species of birds

Carnaby's black cockatoo (Zanda latirostris), also known as the short-billed black cockatoo, is a large black cockatoo endemic to southwest Australia. It was described in 1948 by naturalist Ivan Carnaby. Measuring 53–58 cm (21–23 in) in length, it has a short crest on the top of its head. Its plumage is mostly greyish black, and it has prominent white cheek patches and a white tail band. The body feathers are edged with white giving a scalloped appearance. Adult males have a dark grey beak and pink eye-rings. Adult females have a bone-coloured beak, grey eye-rings and ear patches that are paler than those of the males.

This cockatoo usually lays a clutch of one to two eggs. It generally takes 28 to 29 days for the female to incubate the eggs, and the young fledge ten to eleven weeks after hatching. The young will stay with the family until the next breeding season, and sometimes even longer. The family leaves the nesting site after the young fledge until the following year. Carnaby's black cockatoo forms flocks when not breeding, with birds in drier habitats usually being more migratory than those in wetter ones. It flies with deep and slow wingbeats, generally high above trees. Seeds of plants of the families Proteaceae and, to a lesser extent, Myrtaceae form a large part of its diet.

Carnaby's black cockatoo nests in hollows situated high in trees with fairly large diameters, generally Eucalyptus. With much of its habitat lost to land clearing and development and threatened by further habitat destruction, Carnaby's black cockatoo is listed as an endangered species by the Federal and Western Australian governments. It is also classified as endangered by the International Union for Conservation of Nature (IUCN). Like most parrots, it is protected by CITES, an international agreement that makes trade, export, and import of listed wild-caught species illegal.

== Taxonomy and naming ==
Carnaby's black cockatoo and Baudin's black cockatoo were once known collectively as the white-tailed black cockatoo (Calyptorhynchus baudinii) until formally classified as separate species. In a 1933 report on the birds of Lake Grace, Western Australian naturalist Ivan Carnaby wrote of a distinctive population of white-tailed black cockatoos that he named mallee black cockatoos. These birds lived in mallee and sandplains, using their large bills to crack open woody seed pods; the typical form had a long narrow bill it used to extract eucalypt seeds from marri seed pods. He classified the large-billed form as a subspecies of the white-tailed black cockatoo in 1948, giving it the name Calyptorhynchus baudinii latirostris. The epithet latirostris is from the Latin latus "wide" and rostrum "bill". The holotype specimen is from Hopetoun, Western Australia.

Among the black cockatoos, the two Western Australian white-tailed species (Carnaby's and Baudin's black cockatoos), together with the yellow-tailed black cockatoo (Z. funerea) of eastern Australia, form the genus Zanda. The two red-tailed species, red-tailed black cockatoo (C. banksii) and glossy black cockatoo (C. lathami), form the genus Calyptorhynchus. The three species of Zanda were formerly included in Calyptorhynchus (and still are by some authorities), but are now widely placed in a genus of their own due to a deep genetic divergence between the two groups. The two genera differ in tail colour, head pattern, juvenile food begging calls and the degree of sexual dimorphism. Males and females of Calyptorhynchus sensu stricto differ markedly in appearance, whereas those of Zanda have similar plumage.

The three species of the genus Zanda have been variously considered as two, then as a single species for many years. During the 1970s, Australian ornithologist Denis Saunders analysed the two white-tailed taxa and found that Baudin's black cockatoo also has a longer wing, and wider and higher skull than Carnaby's black cockatoo. Furthermore, there was no overlap in the range of culmen (bill) lengths. In a 1979 paper, Saunders highlighted the similarity between the short-billed and the southern race xanthanotus of the yellow-tailed and treated them as a single species with the long-billed as a distinct species. He proposed that Western Australia had been colonised on two separate occasions, once by a common ancestor of all three forms (which became the long-billed black cockatoo), and later by what has become the short-billed black cockatoo. An analysis of protein allozymes published in 1984 revealed the two Western Australian forms to be more closely related to each other than to the yellow-tailed, and the consensus since then has been to treat them as three separate species.

The two white-tailed cockatoo species were called short-billed and long-billed black cockatoos in scientific works, yet they were called Carnaby's and Baudin's black cockatoo in Western Australia. Hence ornithologists Les Christidis and Walter Boles pushed for the latter two names to be used. The International Ornithologists' Union has taken up this suggestion and uses these names as their official common names.

The local Noongar people did not distinguish between Carnaby's and Baudin's black cockatoos. Nyungar names recorded include ngolyenok and ngoolyoo (from Northampton).

== Description ==
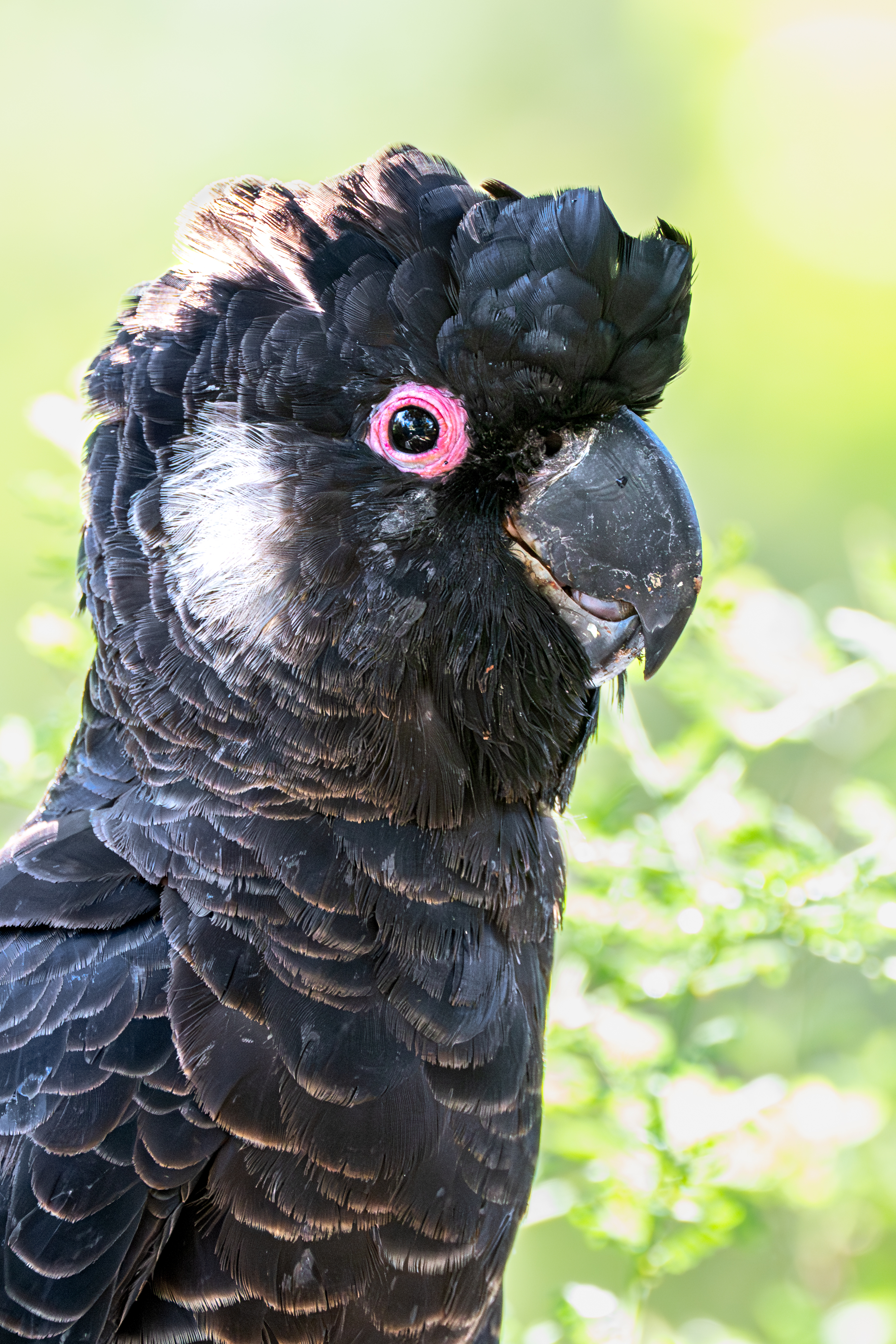
Adult male at Yanchep National Park, Western Australia

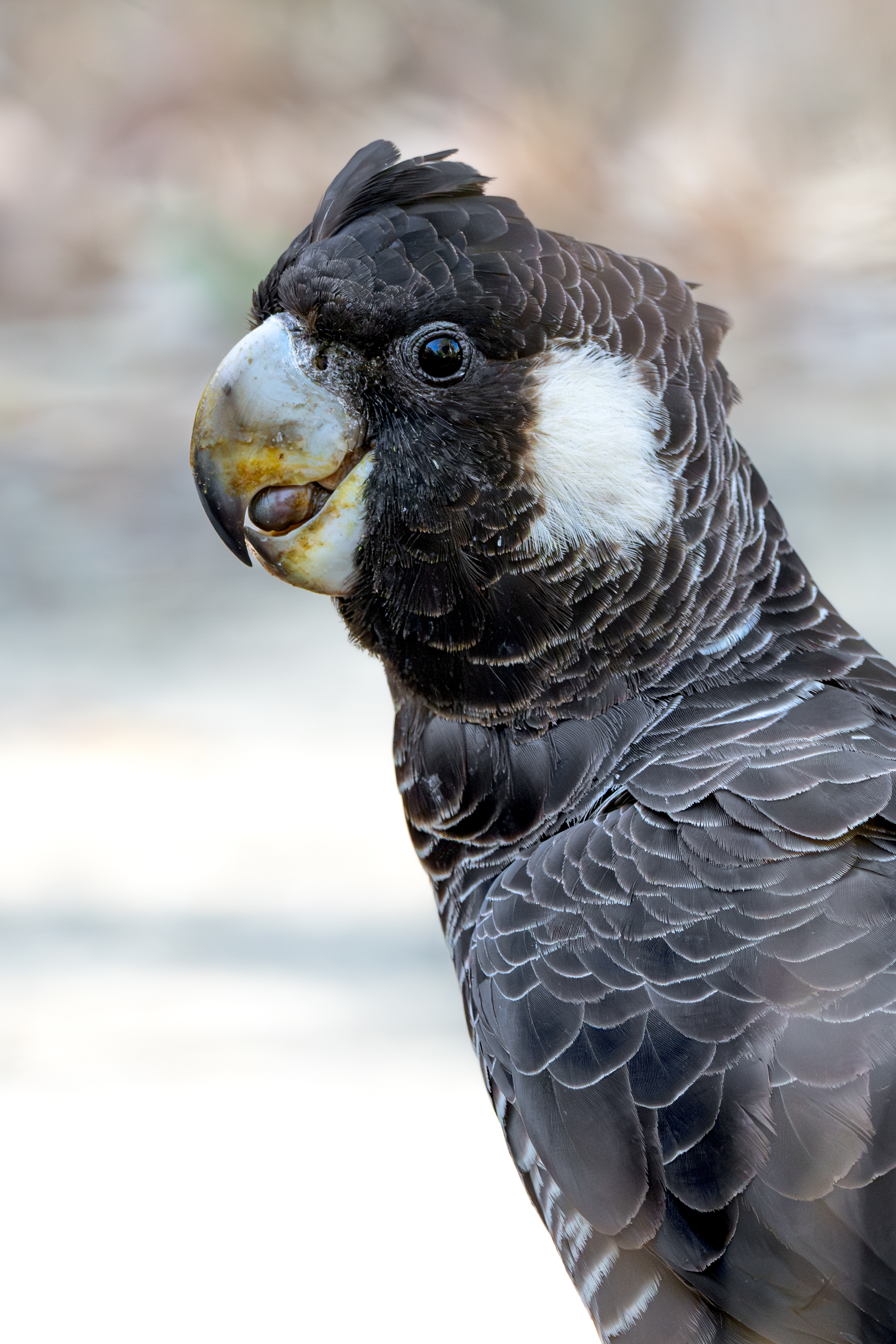
Adult female at Yanchep National Park, Western Australia

Carnaby's black cockatoo is 53–58 cm (21–23 in) in length with a 110 cm (43 in) wingspan, and weighs 520–790 grams. It is mostly greyish black, with narrow light grey scalloping produced by narrow off white margins at the tips of dark feathers. The scalloping is more prominent on the neck. It has a crest of 2.5–3 cm (0.98–1.18 in) long feathers on its head that form a short crest that can be raised and lowered, and a prominent off-white patch of feathers on its cheek. Its lateral tail feathers are white with black tips, and the central tail feathers all black. The irises are dark brown and the legs brown-grey. Its beak is shorter and broader than that of the closely related and similar Baudin's black cockatoo; the two are often difficult to distinguish in the field.

The adult male has a dark grey beak and pink eye-rings. The adult female has a bone-coloured beak, grey eye-rings and ear patches that are whiter and more distinctive than those of the male. The feathers of its underparts and underwing coverts have larger white margins than those of the male, leading to a more barred or scalloped pattern to its plumage. Its legs and feet are a little lighter than those of the male. Moulting appears to take place in stages in late summer—some time between January or February and April or May, and is poorly understood.

Juveniles have a bone-coloured beak, grey eye-rings, and less white in the tail feathers. They can also be distinguished by their constant begging calls. It is not possible to tell the sexes apart until the male's bill begins to darken. This begins when the male is around one year old, and is complete some time after two years of age.

== Distribution and habitat ==
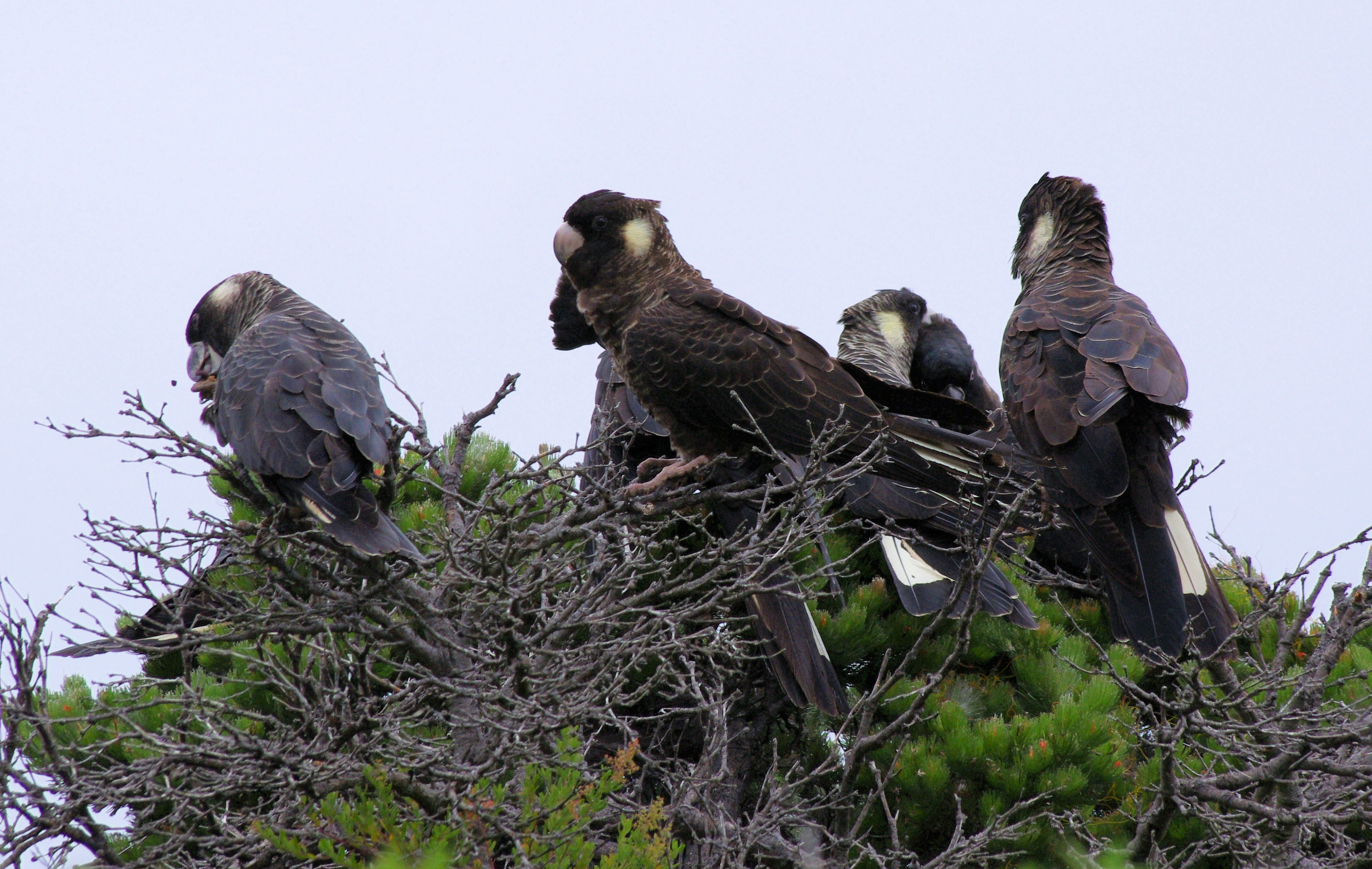
Carnaby's black cockatoos form larger groups outside of breeding season.

Carnaby's black cockatoo is found across a broad swathe of southwest Australia—mostly within the Wheatbelt region—in places that receive over 300 mm (12 in) of rainfall yearly. The limits of its range include Cape Arid to the east, Lake Cronin, Hatters Hill and Lake Moore inland, and Kalbarri to the north. Breeding takes place in areas receiving 350–700 mm (14–28 in) rainfall a year, from the Stirling Range to Three Springs as well as around Bunbury. The cockatoo pairs form flocks outside the breeding season, moving away from nesting areas. Carnaby's black cockatoo is sedentary in wetter parts of its range, and migratory in drier areas as birds move south and west towards the coast in summer.

Carnaby's black cockatoo is found in Eucalyptus woodland, most commonly of wandoo (Eucalyptus wandoo) or salmon gum (E. salmonophloia). It is also found nearby pine plantations and sandplains or kwongan heath with abundant Hakea, Banksia, and Grevillea shrubs.

== Behaviour ==
Carnaby's black cockatoo communicates by auditory and visual displays. The voice is generally noisy with several calls; loudest and most frequent is a wailing wy-lah, which is uttered by both sexes and often heard before the birds themselves are seen. There is usually an interval of 0.4 seconds before the call is repeated. This call is made by birds in flight, before taking off and returning to the nest. Carnaby's black cockatoos that are not in flight may answer with this call when they hear it. The call is often shortened or chopped off three-quarters of the way through as the bird takes off. The call varies between individual Carnaby's black cockatoos, and older nestlings can distinguish their parents' calls. Saunders labelled a variant of the wy-lah as the interrogative call—it is drawn out and ends with an inflection. Birds often utter a soft chuck call when alone. Females make a whistling call composed of two notes of varying volume when perched or about to take off. They also utter a softer version that is 0.6 seconds long, as well as a long single-noted whistle when alone. The male makes a soft shot wy-lah call in similar situations. Birds may also make a harsh screeching alarm call when they notice something is out of place. They squawk loudly in disputes with their own kind, when other animals enter breeding territory, or when they are handled by people in captivity. Males can utter a harsh chattering squeak when arguing with other males.

Males make two calls that are directed at females, sometimes as a prelude to mating. One is a sequence of short squeaks; the other is made up of consecutive ah notes with 0.1 second between each note. These calls can be brief or last up to several minutes. Nestlings make a noisy grating begging call when seeking or expecting food. An adult female may also make the call while incubating the eggs. Immature birds also make a grating call not associated with begging that parents ignore.

Carnaby's black cockatoo flies with deep, slow wingbeats, giving it a wavelike movement. It can also glide for extended periods with its wings held downwards. Flocks generally fly at height, descending to treetops to feed or roost. Birds can be agile, manoeuvring quickly if startled or disturbed. In contrast, they waddle awkwardly on the ground.

Previously, the maximum age recorded from banding was 25 years 10.8 months for a bird banded in November 1988 at Coomallo Creek and encountered in a field 5 km away at Tootbardie in October 2014. However, in October 2021, a male individual was discovered to be alive and still nesting at the age of 35, having first been tagged in 1986. The bird was discovered six kilometres from where it had been originally tagged.

=== Breeding ===
Carnaby's black cockatoos begin breeding from four years of age and mate for life. Mature wandoo and salmon gum woodlands provide important breeding habitat for the cockatoos as they need large hollows in tall trees. The nests are generally located about 5.7 metres (19 ft) above the ground, and spaced 174 metres (571 ft) away from each other, on average. There is competition for nest hollows with western corellas (Cacatua pastinator), galahs (Eolophus roseicapilla), and feral honeybees (Apis mellifera). Galahs seek out hollows at any time of year, unlike the Carnaby's black cockatoos, which only look before breeding. Mated pairs return to a breeding locale in late winter and begin preparing to breed, the female choosing a suitable hollow in a tree. She becomes highly territorial, driving off other females from the vicinity of the nest. After a bushfire burnt out much of the species' breeding habitat in 2009, local wildlife officers of the Department of Parks and Wildlife in Western Australia constructed artificial breeding hollows. After some experimentation by authorities, the survival rate of nestlings in these hollows increased to 75%.

Breeding season is from late winter to summer. The female lays a clutch of one or two white eggs, with the second egg laid eight days after the first. One egg is generally larger in a two-egg clutch, and does not differ in size from the egg of a single-egg clutch. It ranges from around 44 to 54 millimetres (1.7 to 2.1 in) long and 32 to 41 millimetres (1.3 to 1.6 in) in diameter. The second egg is around 3 mm shorter. The egg has been calculated to weigh around 33 g, which is 5% of that of the adult female. The female incubates the eggs alone over a period of 28 to 29 days. The eggs hatch asynchronously, with the second one hatching eight days after the first. The second chick usually perishes within the first two days of life; only a small number fledge successfully. Newly hatched chicks are covered with pale yellow down, and are blind. They can sit but are otherwise helpless. By the third week, their eyes begin to open and they have a greyish colour as the black pin feathers start to appear under the down. The down has largely disappeared by week five and the black feathers and pale cheek patch are prominent. Female young have a whiter cheek patch from this age onwards. The nestlings are usually fed by both parents, with the chicks fledging ten to eleven weeks after hatching. The chicks usually remain in the company of their parents till at least the next breeding season or even longer. The family leaves the vicinity of the nest until they return to breed the following season.

=== Feeding ===
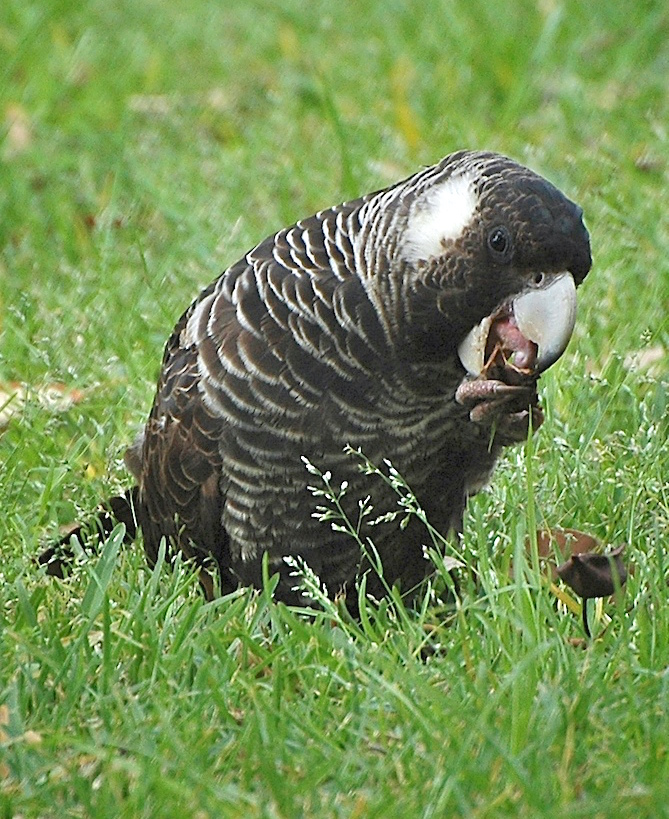
Female feeding in Kings Park

The cockatoo feeds primarily on seeds of proteaceous plants such as Banksia, Hakea and Grevillea, and secondarily on seeds from myrtaceous plants such as Eucalyptus and Corymbia. Over fifty native plant species are commonly used for food, either as seed or flowers, and this includes western sheoak (Allocasuarina fraseriana), orange wattle (Acacia saligna), and balga (Xanthorrhoea preissii). Typically, Carnaby's black cockatoos sit in the crowns of trees cracking the seed pods or cones. First, a bird chews through the stem holding the item before holding it with its foot and tearing bits off and extracting the seed. Birds may move along the branches breaking stems at random as well. Occasionally they forage for fallen seed and fruit on the ground. This cockatoo acts as an agent in biological control, eating the larvae of invertebrates such as wood-boring insects and moths from rare plants.

The Swan Coastal Plain north of Perth has become an important feeding area. There, cockatoos also forage in the Gnangara pine plantations, where they feed on the seeds of Monterey pine (Pinus radiata) and maritime pine (Pinus pinaster). Carnaby's black cockatoos have come to depend on these plantations since the early 20th century. Almost two-thirds of the Carnaby's black cockatoos in the Perth–Peel Coastal Plain roost in the Gnangara-Pinjar pine plantation. Other non-native plants that the birds also consume include Erodium species, doublegee (Emex australis) seeds, the fruit of the umbrella tree (Heptapleurum actinophyllum), seeds of liquidambar (Liquidambar styraciflua), sunflower (Helianthus annuus), jacaranda (Jacaranda mimosifolia), almond (Prunus amygdalus), onion grass (Romulea rosea), white cedar (Melia azedarach), and hibiscus flowers.

When it is not breeding, a Carnaby's black cockatoo forages over land ranging from 17 to 276 square kilometres (6.6 to 106.6 mi^{2}) around roost sites, although daily movements are generally short, with birds travelling an average of 5.4 kilometres (3.4 mi) from the roost during the morning and 5.5 kilometres (3.4 mi) in the afternoon.

== Predators and parasites ==
The wedge-tailed eagle (Aquila audax) kills Carnaby's black cockatoos sporadically, and is the only natural predator of the adult cockatoo. Carnaby's black cockatoo is occasionally parasitised by the bird louse species Franciscoloa funerei. In captivity, it is also susceptible to nematodes of the genus Ascaris if it is in a cage with open dirt flooring.

== Status and conservation ==
The cockatoo is recognised as endangered under the federal Environment Protection and Biodiversity Conservation Act 1999, and as Schedule 1 "fauna that is rare or is likely to become extinct" by Western Australia's Wildlife Conservation (Specially Protected Fauna) Notice 2008(2) under the Wildlife Conservation Act 1950. The population size of Carnaby's cockatoo fell by over 50% in 45 years, and up to a third of their traditional breeding grounds in the Wheatbelt have been abandoned. The bird is part of an annual census, the Great Cocky count, that has been held every year since 2009 to track the population change of Carnaby's and other black cockatoos. The 2016 Great Cocky Count counted 10,919 Carnaby's black cockatoos, indicating the population had declined by 50% on the Perth–Peel Coastal Plain since 2010, dropping by around 10% each year. The total population is estimated to consist of 40,000 individuals.

Major threats to the cockatoo include clearance of their feeding and nesting habitat, destruction of nesting hollows (e.g. during firewood collection), competition with other species for nest sites, and poaching. Since European settlement, 56% of its habitat has been cleared, mainly for agriculture. Furthermore, 54% of its habitat on the Swan Coastal Plain—an important area outside the breeding season—has been lost. Much of this area lies within the Perth metropolitan area, and the city's population is predicted to increase 70% by 2050. The Western Australian State Government has produced a Green Growth Plan to manage this expansion; conservation groups are concerned the cockatoo (along with other species) could suffer further loss of habitat. In particular, the loss of pine plantations north of Perth could jeopardise the species' food supply. In February 2017, WWF-Australia and BirdLife Australia appealed to the Federal Environment Minister Josh Frydenberg to intervene and halt the ongoing removal of pine trees. BirdLife International designated 13 sites (Important Bird Areas) as being important specifically for Carnaby's black cockatoo. These are the Northern Swan Coastal Plain, which supports between 4600 and 15000 birds outside the breeding season, the Stirling Range, and 11 other sites that support between 20 and 110 breeding pairs of Carnaby's black cockatoos. (Note: The others are Bindoon-Julimar (110 pairs – largest population in south western Australia), Calingiri (up to 20 pairs), Cataby (up to 24 pairs), Coomallo (up to 40 pairs), East Borden (at least 20 pairs), Gillingarra (up to 20 pairs), Jalbarragup (at least 20 pairs), Koobabbie (up to 32 pairs), Kwobrup-Badgebup (up to 20 pairs), Moora (up to 60 pairs), and Walebing (up to 40 pairs).)

The species' low rate of reproduction and long period of immaturity render it vulnerable to rapid change in the environment as response and recovery are slow. Their habit of forming flocks predisposes them to outbreaks of disease and localised adverse weather events. A probable outbreak of a disease led to the deaths of up to 23 breeding female cockatoos at Koobabbie in September–October 2009, a hailstorm killed 68 individuals around Perth on 22 March 2010, and 145 perished in a heatwave around Hopetoun when temperatures reached 48 °C (118 °F) on 6 January 2010. Temperature and weather extremes in southwest Australia are predicted to worsen with climate change. Carnaby's black cockatoos have been brought to veterinary hospitals with traumatic injuries. Motor vehicles are a hazard, as much vegetation useful to Carnaby's black cockatoos lies on road verges. The cockatoos fly into open space when leaving the vegetation, which is often over a road and in the path of oncoming traffic.

Like most species of parrots, Carnaby's black cockatoo is protected by the Convention on International Trade in Endangered Species of Wild Fauna and Flora (CITES) with its placement on the Appendix II list of vulnerable species, which makes the import, export, and trade of listed wild-caught animals illegal.

== Cited texts ==
- Christidis, Les; Boles, Walter E. (2008). Systematics and Taxonomy of Australian Birds. Canberra: CSIRO Publishing. ISBN 978-0-643-06511-6.
- Forshaw, Joseph M. (2006). Parrots of the World; an Identification Guide. Illustrated by Frank Knight. Princeton, New Jersey: Princeton University Press. ISBN 978-0-691-09251-5.
- Gray, Jeannie; Fraser, Ian (2013). Australian Bird Names: A Complete Guide. Collingwood, Victoria: CSIRO Publishing. ISBN 978-0-643-10471-6.
- Higgins, P.J. (1999). Handbook of Australian, New Zealand and Antarctic Birds. Volume 4: Parrots to Dollarbird. Melbourne, Victoria: Oxford University Press. ISBN 978-0-19-553071-1.
- Lamont, Byron B. (1994). "Triangular Trophic Relationships in Mediterranean-climate Western Australia". In Arianoutsou-Faraggitaki, M.; Groves, R.H. (eds.). Plant-Animal Interactions in Mediterranean-type Ecosystems. Tasks for vegetation science. Vol. 31. New York: Springer Verlag. pp. 83–89. doi:10.1007/978-94-011-0908-6_8. ISBN 978-94-010-4392-2. ISSN 0167-9406.
