= Henry Steedman =

Scottish-born Australian botanist (1866-1953)

Henry Steedman (1866–1953) was a Scottish-born Australian botanist.

Born in Scotland in 1866, he emigrated to Western Australia at the age of 21. He was head gardener at the South Perth Zoological Gardens (now Perth Zoo) for many years, but was retrenched in the late 1920s with the onset of the Great Depression. Thereafter he spent his time collecting seeds and specimens of native plants. He made a number of collecting expeditions, including one east to Kalgoorlie with Ivan Carnaby; another south as far as Ravensthorpe, also with Carnaby; and one along the west coast from Bunbury to Geraldton. He collected the type specimens for a number of Eucalyptus taxa, including E. crucis (Silver Mallee), E. erythandra (Rosebud Gum), E. rhodantha (Rose Mallee) and E. steedmanii (Steedman's Gum). He was joint publisher with Joyce Blakely of the second and third of these species, and also E. burdettiana (Burdett Gum), E. carnabyi and E. chrysantha. E. steedmanii was named in his honour, as was Acacia steedmanii and Melaleuca fulgens subsp. steedmanii.
