= Eucalyptus mimica =

Conservation status
- Endangered (IUCN 3.1)

Scientific classification
- Kingdom: Plantae
- Clade: Tracheophytes
- Clade: Angiosperms
- Clade: Eudicots
- Clade: Rosids
- Order: Myrtales
- Family: Myrtaceae
- Genus: Eucalyptus
- Species: E. mimica

Binomial name
- Eucalyptus mimica Brooker & Hopper

Species of eucalyptus

Eucalyptus mimica is a species of mallet that is endemic to a small area of Western Australia. It has smooth, shiny bark, linear to narrow elliptical leaves held erect, flower buds in groups of three and conical fruit with ribbed sides.

== Description ==
Eucalyptus mimica is a mallet that typically grows to a height of 5 m (16 ft) and does not form a lignotuber. It has smooth, shiny green bark that is copper-coloured when fresh. Adult leaves are the same shade of glossy green on both sides, held erect, linear to narrow elliptical, 35–85 mm (1.4–3.3 in) long and 4–9 mm (0.16–0.35 in) wide on a petiole up to 6 mm (0.24 in) long. The flower buds are arranged in groups of three on an unbranched peduncle 7–20 mm (0.28–0.79 in) long, the individual buds on pedicels 5–8 mm (0.20–0.31 in) long. Mature buds are oval to spindle-shaped, 12–19 mm (0.47–0.75 in) long and 4–6 mm (0.16–0.24 in) wide with a conical to beaked operculum. The fruit is a woody, conical capsule with three or four ribs along the sides, 7–12 mm (0.28–0.47 in) long and 7–10 mm (0.28–0.39 in) wide with the valves near rim level or slightly protruding. This species is similar to E. steedmanii but has smaller buds and fruit.

== Taxonomy ==
Eucalyptus mimica was first formally described in 2002 by Ian Brooker and Stephen Hopper in the journal Nuytsia, from specimens collected by Brooker south of Newdegate. The specific epithet alludes to the similarity of this species to E. steedmanii.

In the same journal, Brooker and Hopper described two subspecies and the names have been accepted by the Australian Plant Census:

- Eucalyptus mimica subsp. continens Brooker & Hopper
- Eucalyptus mimica Brooker & Hopper subsp. mimica The subspecies differ in the colour of their bark, the form of the operculum and habitat preferences. Subspecies mimica grows in more saline environments.

== Distribution and habitat ==
This mallet is found on flats and in depressions around salt lakes, growing in sandy-clay soils. Subspecies mimica occurs from east of Pingrup to south of Newdegate. Subspecies continens is only known from roadsides and private land south of Newdegate.

== Conservation status ==
Both subspecies have been given a priority status by the Government of Western Australia Department of Parks and Wildlife. Subspecies continens is listed as "Priority One", meaning that it is known from only one or a few locations that are potentially at risk. Subspecies mimica is classified by the Government of Western Australia as "Priority Three", meaning that it is poorly known and known from only a few locations but is not under imminent threat.

== See also ==
- List of Eucalyptus species
