= Eucalyptus × erythrandra =

Scientific classification
- Kingdom: Plantae
- Clade: Tracheophytes
- Clade: Angiosperms
- Clade: Eudicots
- Clade: Rosids
- Order: Myrtales
- Family: Myrtaceae
- Genus: Eucalyptus
- Species: E. × erythrandra

Binomial name
- Eucalyptus × erythrandra Blakely & H.Steedman

Synonyms
- Eucalyptus angulosa var. robusta Gardner

Species of eucalyptus

Eucalyptus × erythrandra, commonly known as rosebud gum, is a species of mallee or shrub that is endemic to Western Australia. It typically grows to a height of 1.5–5 m (4 ft 11 in – 16 ft 5 in) and has smooth grey bark, and pinkish flowers from September to October or January. It grows in mallee scrub in the Esperance Plains and Mallee biogeographic regions.

This eucalypt was originally given the name Eucalyptus erythrandra by William Blakely and Henry Steedman who published the description in Proceedings of the Linnean Society of New South Wales. It is now accepted by the Australian Plant Census as a hybrid, either between E. incrassata and E. tetraptera or between E. angulosa and E. tetraptera.
