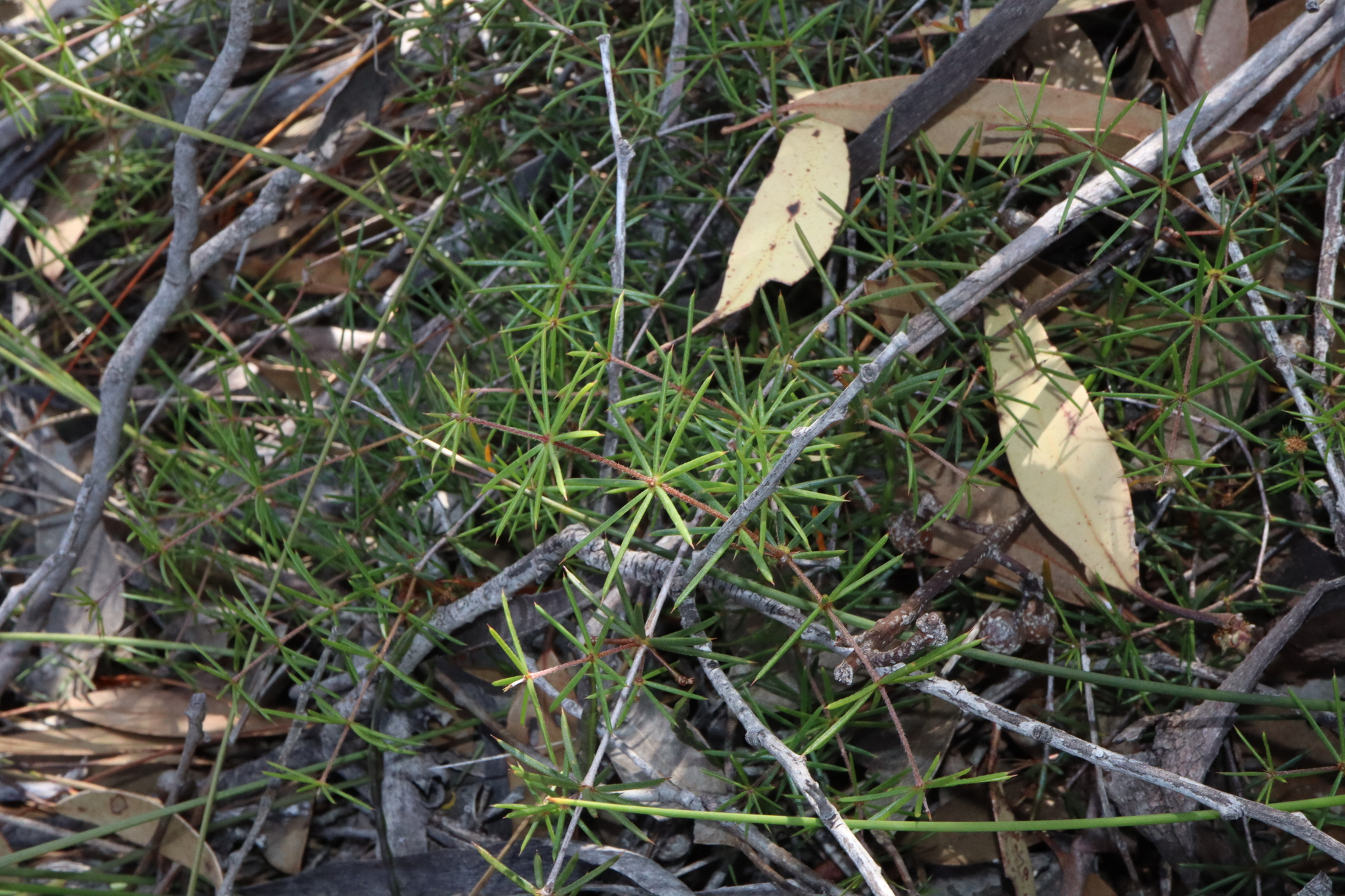
- Foliage in the Fitzgerald River National Park

Conservation status
- Priority Four — Rare Taxa (DEC)

Scientific classification
- Kingdom: Plantae
- Clade: Embryophytes
- Clade: Tracheophytes
- Clade: Spermatophytes
- Clade: Angiosperms
- Clade: Eudicots
- Clade: Rosids
- Order: Fabales
- Family: Fabaceae
- Subfamily: Caesalpinioideae
- Clade: Mimosoid clade
- Genus: Acacia
- Species: A. simulans

Binomial name
- Acacia simulans Maslin
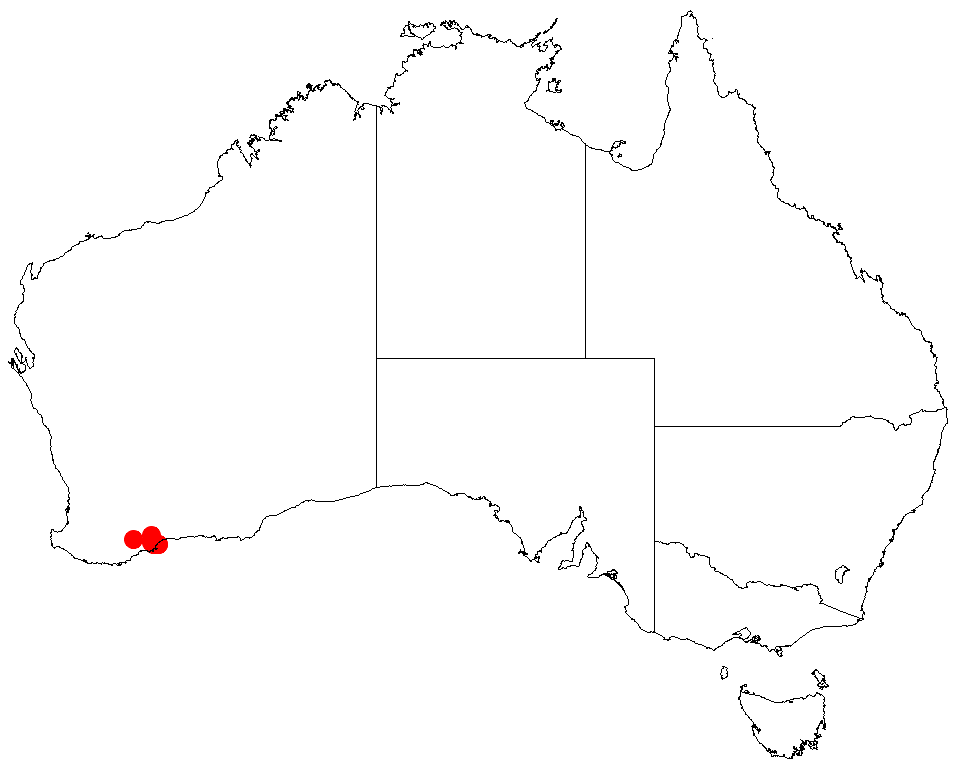
- Occurrence data from AVH

= Acacia simulans =

Species of legume

Acacia simulans is a shrub of the genus Acacia and the subgenus Phyllodineae that is endemic to south western Australia.

== Description ==
The diffuse openly branched shrub typically grows to a height of 0.3 to 1.0 metre (1.0 to 3.3 ft). It has glabrous or sparsely haired grey coloured branchlets with 1 mm (0.039 in) long stipules. Like most species of Acacia it has phyllodes rather than true leaves. The phyllodes are arranged in whorls with six to nine phyllodes in each group. The rigid, pungent and glabrous phyllodes are patent to slightly reflexed and straight to slightly recurved with a tetragonous or sometimes trigonous cross-section. The phyllodes are 8 to 15 mm (0.31 to 0.59 in)in length and around 1 mm (0.039 in) wide with four main 4-nerves. It blooms from July to September and produces yellow flowers. The simple inflorescences are found singly or in pairs in the axils and have spherical slightly obloid shaped flower-heads containing 16 to 20 cream to pale yellow coloured flower. Following flowering glabrous, firmly chartaceous, dark brown seed pods form that resemble a string of beads with a length of up to 7 cm (2.8 in) and a width of 3 to 4 mm (0.12 to 0.16 in). The shiny dark brown seeds inside have a widely oblong-elliptic shape with a length of around 4 mm (0.16 in) and a conical terminal aril.

== Taxonomy ==
The species was first formally described by the botanist Bruce Maslin in 1976 as a part of the work Studies in the genus Acacia (Mimosaceae) - Miscellaneous new phyllodinous species as published in the journal Nuytsia. It was reclassified as Racosperma simulans by Leslie Pedley on 2003 then transferred back to genus Acacia in 2006.

== Distribution ==
It is native to a small area in the Great Southern and Goldfields-Esperance regions of Western Australia from around Jerramungup in the west to Ravensthorpe in the east where it typically is found growing in sandy soils over quartzite. The range is limited to the Fitzgerald River National Park where it forms part of scrubland or heathland communities that are dominated by Eucalyptus tetraptera.

== See also ==
- List of Acacia species
