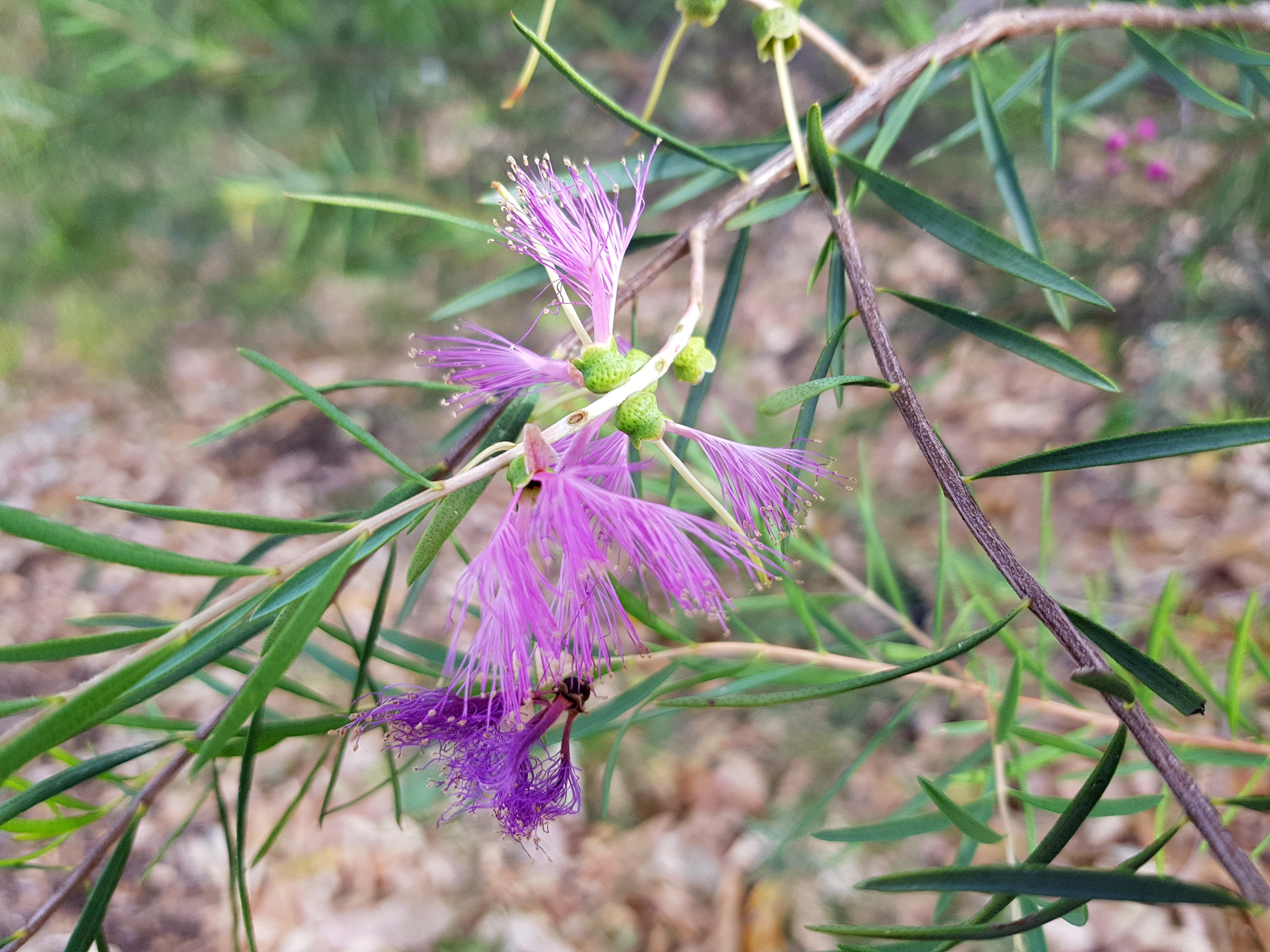

Scientific classification
- Kingdom: Plantae
- Clade: Tracheophytes
- Clade: Angiosperms
- Clade: Eudicots
- Clade: Rosids
- Order: Myrtales
- Family: Myrtaceae
- Genus: Melaleuca
- Species: M. fulgens
- Subspecies: M. f. subsp. steedmanii

Trinomial name
- Melaleuca fulgens subsp. steedmanii (C.A.Gardner) K.J.Cowley

= Melaleuca fulgens subsp. steedmanii =

Scarlet honey myrtle

Subspecies of flowering plant

Melaleuca fulgens subsp. steedmanii, commonly known as the scarlet honey myrtle, is a plant in the myrtle family, Myrtaceae and is endemic to the south-west of Western Australia. In 1990, the species Melaleuca fulgens was separated into 3 subspecies. Of the two subspecies occurring in the south-west, this one has the narrower distribution, occurring mainly near Geraldton. As with the other subspecies, this one is notable for its showy flowers which are usually red but its foliage and fruits are also attractive features.

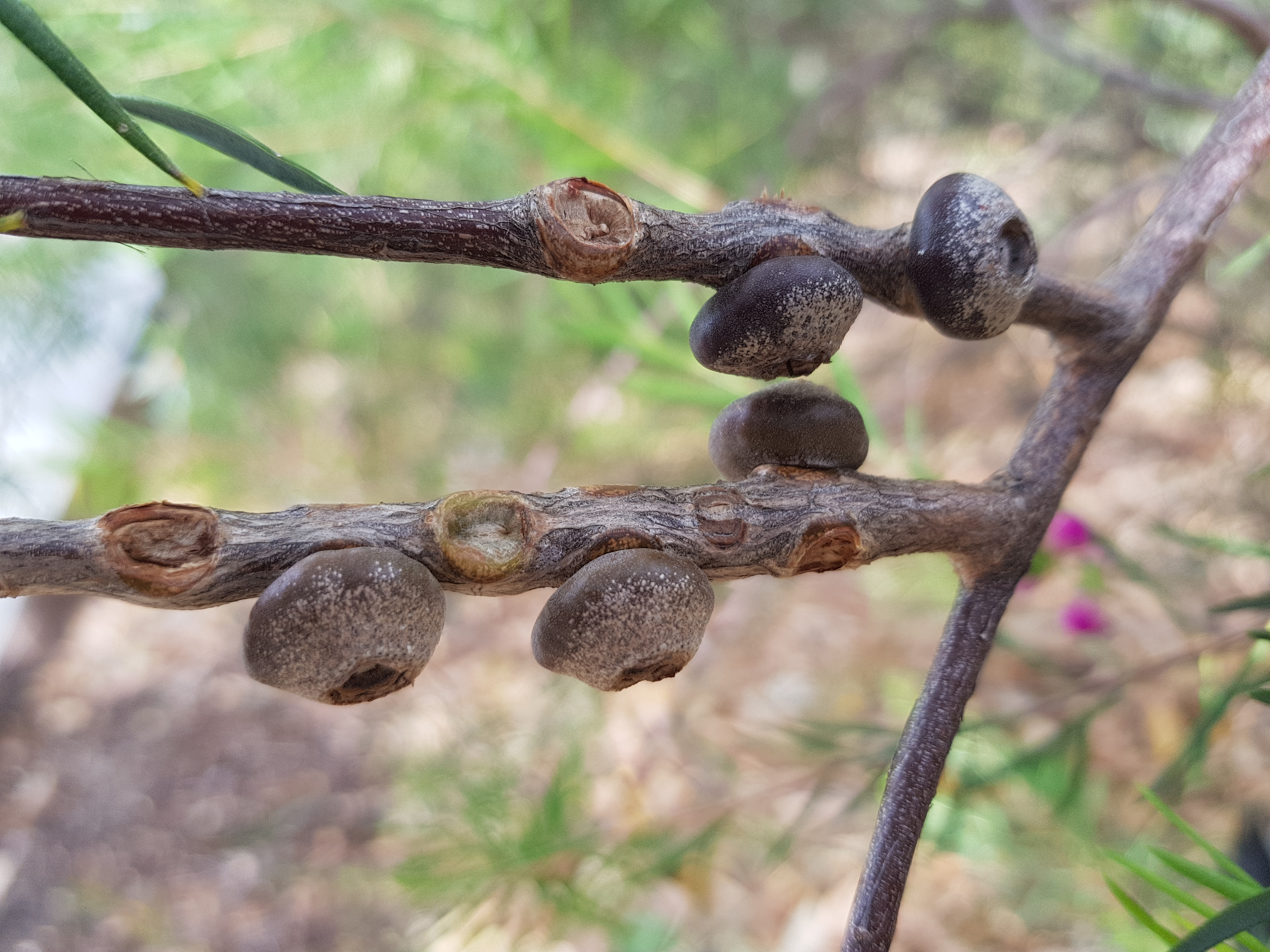
fruit.

== Description ==
Melaleuca fulgens subsp. steedmanii is a woody shrub growing to a height of up to 3 metres (10 ft) and sometimes a width of 3 metres (10 ft), with glabrous branchlets. Its leaves are blue-green and arranged in alternating pairs at right angles to those immediately above and below (decussate) so that the leaves are in four rows along the stems. The leaves are 10–40 millimetres (0.4–2 in) long, 0.7–5.5 millimetres (0.03–0.2 in) wide, narrow egg-shaped with a rounded end but with a small, distinct point in the middle. Sometimes the edges of the leaves are turned under, giving the appearance of a linear shape.

The flowers are usually bright red, but sometimes other shades of red, pink or white and are arranged in spikes on the sides of the branches. The spikes are up to 40 millimetres (2 in) in diameter and 40 millimetres (2 in) long. Each spike contains 6 to 20 individual flowers arranged in a decussate pattern. The stamens are arranged in five bundles around the flower, each bundle containing 22 to 80 stamens. The stamen filaments are 7.5–13 millimetres (0.3–0.5 in)long. The flowers appear from July to December but mostly in September and October although flowering time is irregular. The fruits which follow the flowers are woody capsules, shaped like a squashed urn and arranged in alternating pairs along the stems.

== Taxonomy and naming ==
Melaleuca fulgens subsp. steedmanii was first formally described in 1928 by Charles Austin Gardner in Journal of the Royal Society of Western Australia as Melaleuca steedmanii. In 1990, in a review of the species by Kirsten Cowley, Frances Quinn, Bryan Barlow and Lyndley Craven in Australian Systematic Botany, Melaleuca steedmanii was recognised as Melaleuca fulgens subsp. steedmanii. The specific epithet (steedmanii) honours Henry Steedman, a Scottish-born Australian botanist.

== Distribution and habitat ==
Melaleuca fulgens subsp. steedmanii occurs in and between the Watheroo and Wannoo districts near Geraldton in the Avon Wheatbelt and Geraldton Sandplains biogeographic regions. It grows in heath and grassy shrubland in sand, loam or lateritic soil near granite outcrops and on sandplains.
