= Melaleuca fulgens subsp. fulgens =

Scientific classification
- Kingdom: Plantae
- Clade: Tracheophytes
- Clade: Angiosperms
- Clade: Eudicots
- Clade: Rosids
- Order: Myrtales
- Family: Myrtaceae
- Genus: Melaleuca
- Species: M. fulgens R.Br.
- Subspecies: M. f. subsp. fulgens

Trinomial name
- Melaleuca fulgens subsp. fulgens

Subspecies of flowering plant

Melaleuca fulgens subsp. fulgens, commonly known as the scarlet honey myrtle, is a plant in the myrtle family, Myrtaceae and is endemic to the south-west of Western Australia. In 1990, the species Melaleuca fulgens was separated into 3 subspecies and this is the most widespread of them. As with the other two subspecies, this one is notable for its showy flowers which are usually red but its foliage and fruits are also attractive features.

== Description ==
Melaleuca fulgens subsp. fulgens is a woody shrub growing to a height of up to 3 metres (10 ft) and a width of 2 metres (7 ft), with glabrous branchlets. Its leaves are arranged in alternating pairs at right angles to those immediately above and below (decussate) so that the leaves are in four rows along the stems. The leaves are 10–40 millimetres (0.4–2 in) long, 0.7–5.5 millimetres (0.03–0.2 in) wide, linear to narrow elliptic in shape, concave and with prominent oil glands.

The flowers are usually bright red, but sometimes other shades of red, pink or white and are arranged in spikes on the sides of the branches. The spikes are up to 40 millimetres (2 in) in diameter and length. Each spike contains 6 to 20 individual flowers arranged in a decussate pattern. The stamens are arranged in five bundles around the flower, each bundle containing 22 to 80 stamens. The stamen filaments are 16.5–27 millimetres (0.6–1 in)long. The flowers appear from June to April but mostly in September and October. The fruits which follow are woody capsules 7–9 millimetres (0.3–0.4 in) in diameter, shaped like a squashed urn and arranged in alternating pairs along the stems.

== Taxonomy and naming ==
Melaleuca fulgens was first formally described by the botanist Robert Brown in William Aiton's Hortus Kewensis in 1812. In 1990, the species was separated into three subspecies by Kirsten Cowley, Frances Quinn, Bryan Barlow and Lyndley Craven in Australian Systematic Botany. The specific epithet "is from the Latin fulgens, shining, bright-coloured, in reference to the bright red flowers".

== Distribution and habitat ==
Melaleuca fulgens subsp. fulgens occurs in and between the Paynes Find, Great Victoria Desert and Israelite Bay districts in the Avon Wheatbelt, Coolgardie, Esperance Plains, Geraldton Sandplains, Great Victoria Desert, Mallee, Murchison and Yalgoo biogeographic regions. It grows in sand, loam or gravel, on granite outcrops.

== Use in horticulture ==
This subspecies of Melaleuca fulgens is commonly grown in Australian gardens but requires full sun and excellent drainage for best results.
