= Acacia steedmanii =

Scientific classification
- Kingdom: Plantae
- Clade: Tracheophytes
- Clade: Angiosperms
- Clade: Eudicots
- Clade: Rosids
- Order: Fabales
- Family: Fabaceae
- Subfamily: Caesalpinioideae
- Clade: Mimosoid clade
- Genus: Acacia
- Species: A. steedmanii

Binomial name
- Acacia steedmanii Maiden & Blakely
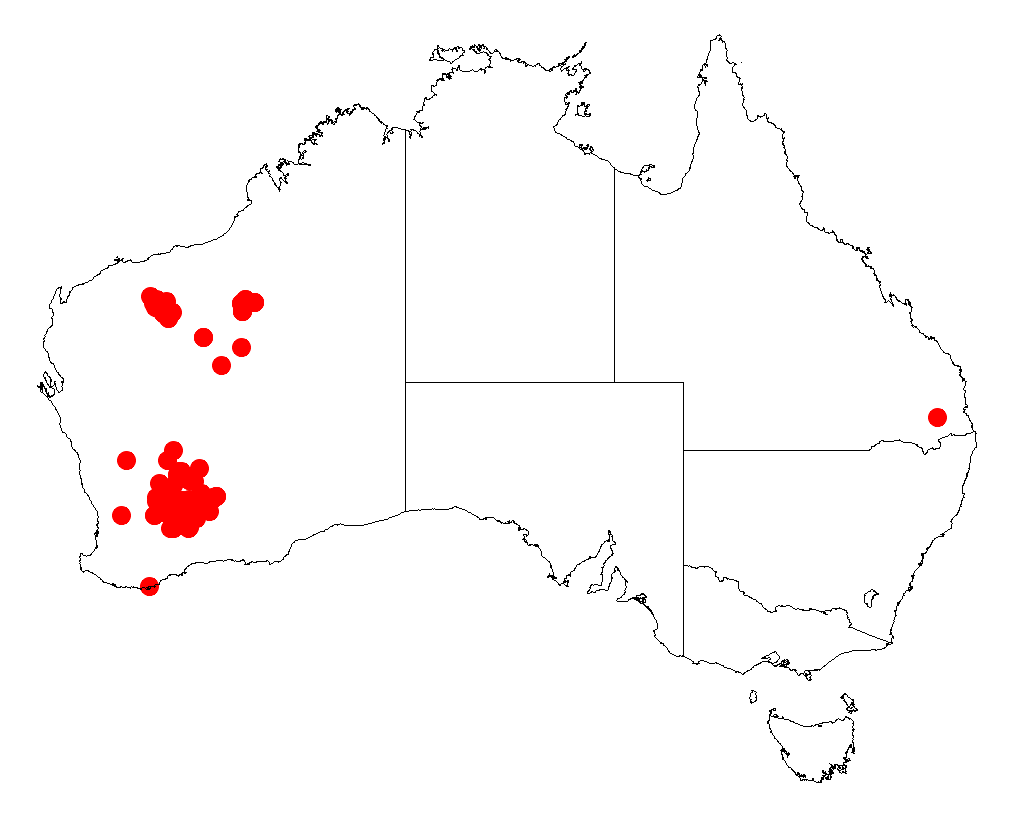
- Occurrence data from AVH

Species of legume

Acacia steedmanii is a shrub or tree of the genus Acacia and the subgenus Phyllodineae. It is native to an area in the Wheatbelt, Pilbara and Goldfields regions of Western Australia.

The shrub or tree typically grows to a height of 1 to 4 metres (3 to 13 ft). It blooms from August to September and produces yellow flowers.

There are two recognised subspecies:

- Acacia steedmanii subsp. borealis
- Acacia steedmanii subsp. steedmanii

== See also ==
- List of Acacia species
