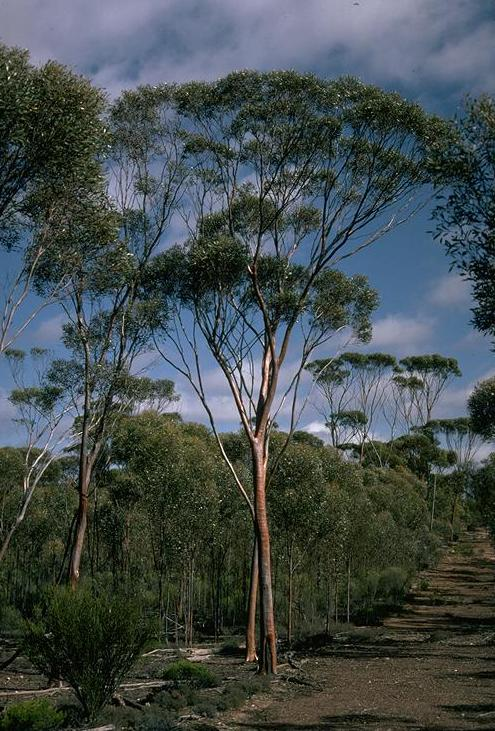
- Eucalyptus steedmanii on the Hyden-Norseman Road

Conservation status
- Vulnerable (IUCN 3.1)

- Vulnerable (EPBC Act)

Scientific classification
- Kingdom: Plantae
- Clade: Tracheophytes
- Clade: Angiosperms
- Clade: Eudicots
- Clade: Rosids
- Order: Myrtales
- Family: Myrtaceae
- Genus: Eucalyptus
- Species: E. steedmanii

Binomial name
- Eucalyptus steedmanii C.A.Gardner

= Eucalyptus steedmanii =

Steedman's gum

Species of eucalyptus

Eucalyptus steedmanii, commonly known as Steedman's gum or Steedman's mallet, is a species of mallet that is endemic to a small region of Western Australia. It has smooth, satiny bark, narrow elliptical leaves, flower buds in groups of three, white flowers and conical, four-winged fruit.

== Description ==
Eucalyptus steedmanii is a mallet that typically grows to a height of 2–12 m (6 ft 7 in – 39 ft 4 in) and does not form a lignotuber. The bark is smooth and satiny, ranging from grey to red-brown or a bright coppery colour. It has numerous ascending branches from low on the trunk, forming a dense crown. Adult leaves are the same glossy, olive-green on both sides, crowded with oil glands, narrow oblong to elliptical, 30–85 mm (1.2–3.3 in) long and 6–15 mm (0.24–0.59 in) wide. The flower buds are arranged in leaf axils in groups of three on a downturned, unbranched peduncle 15–31 mm (0.59–1.22 in) long, the individual buds on pedicels 12–20 mm (0.47–0.79 in) long. Mature buds are yellowish-brown, spindle-shaped and square in cross-section, 20–32 mm (0.79–1.26 in) long and 9–14 mm (0.35–0.55 in) wide, the operculum splitting into four as the bud develops. It blooms between January and March producing white flowers. The fruit is a woody, conical, four-winged capsule 14–20 mm (0.55–0.79 in) long and 13–22 mm (0.51–0.87 in) wide with the valves near rim level.

== Taxonomy and naming ==
Eucalyptus steedmanii was first formally described by the botanist Charles Gardner in 1933 in the Journal of the Royal Society of Western Australia from a specimen collected by Henry Steedman south of Southern Cross in 1928. The specific epithet (steedmanii) honours Steedman.

== Distribution and habitat ==
Steedman's gum is found on low hills and undulating plains between Ravensthorpe in the Goldfields-Esperance and Kondinin in the Wheatbelt region where it grows in gravelly loamy soils over ironstone. Six populations are known, five of these occur on unallocated Crown land, and one which is split occurs on Crown land and a road verge. It is estimated that there is a total population of 24 500 mature plants that are spread over an area of 83.6 square kilometres (32 sq mi) and tend to occur in pure stands.

== Conservation status ==
This mallet was listed as Vulnerable in 2008 under the Environment Protection and Biodiversity Conservation Act 1999 and as "Threatened Flora (Declared Rare Flora — Extant)" by the Department of Environment and Conservation (Western Australia). The main threat to the tree is fire which kills adult plants, but regeneration by seed has been observed. Other threats include mining operations, firebreak maintenance and recreation activities. The IUCN Red List assesses the species as Vulnerable.

== See also ==
- List of Eucalyptus species
