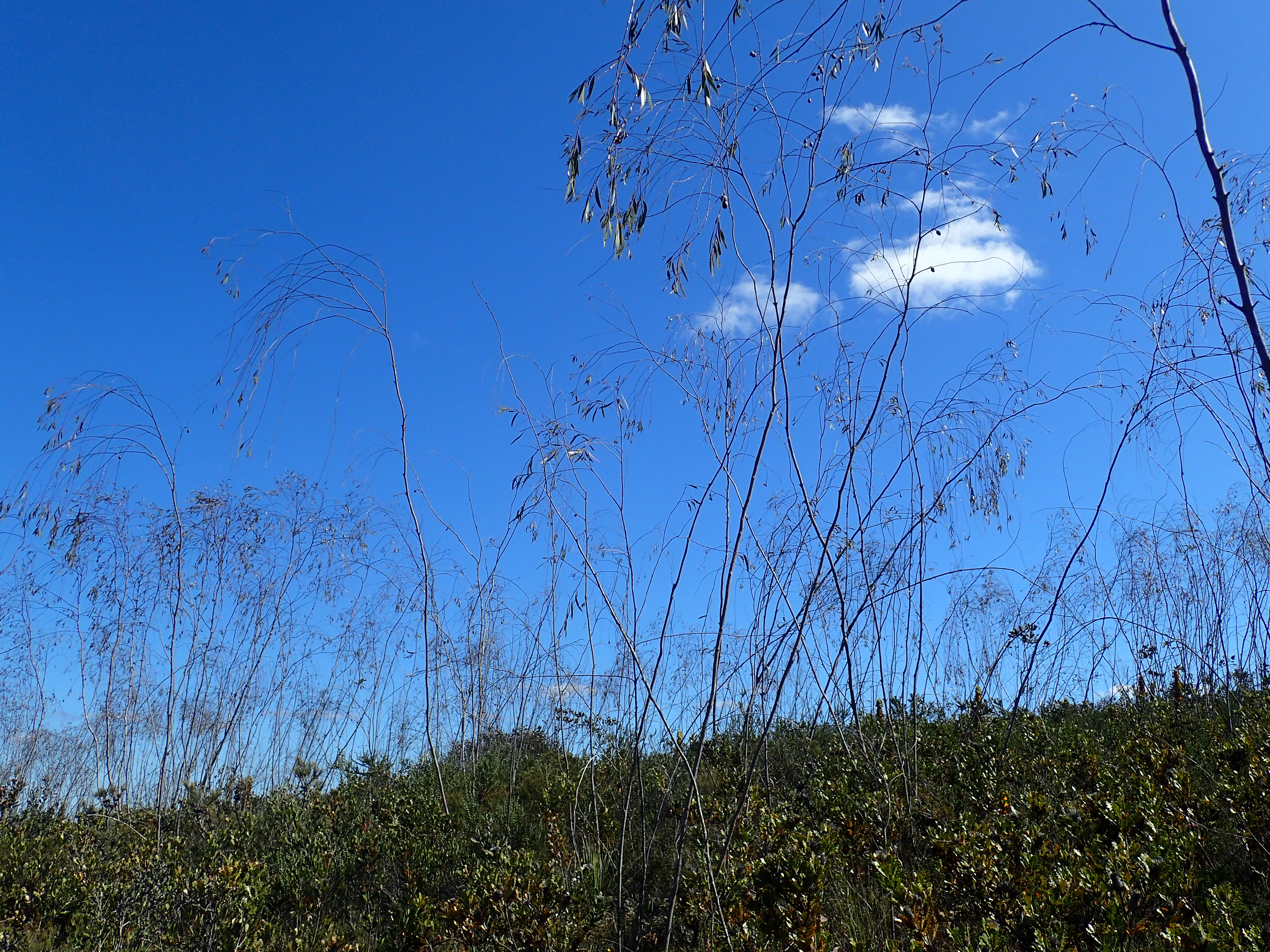
- Eucalyptus sepulcralis in the Fitzgerald River National Park

Conservation status
- Least Concern (IUCN 3.1)

Scientific classification
- Kingdom: Plantae
- Clade: Embryophytes
- Clade: Tracheophytes
- Clade: Spermatophytes
- Clade: Angiosperms
- Clade: Eudicots
- Clade: Rosids
- Order: Myrtales
- Family: Myrtaceae
- Genus: Eucalyptus
- Species: E. sepulcralis

Binomial name
- Eucalyptus sepulcralis F.Muell.

Synonyms
- Eucalyptus sepulcralis F.Muell. var. sepulcralis

= Eucalyptus sepulcralis =

Weeping gum

Species of eucalyptus

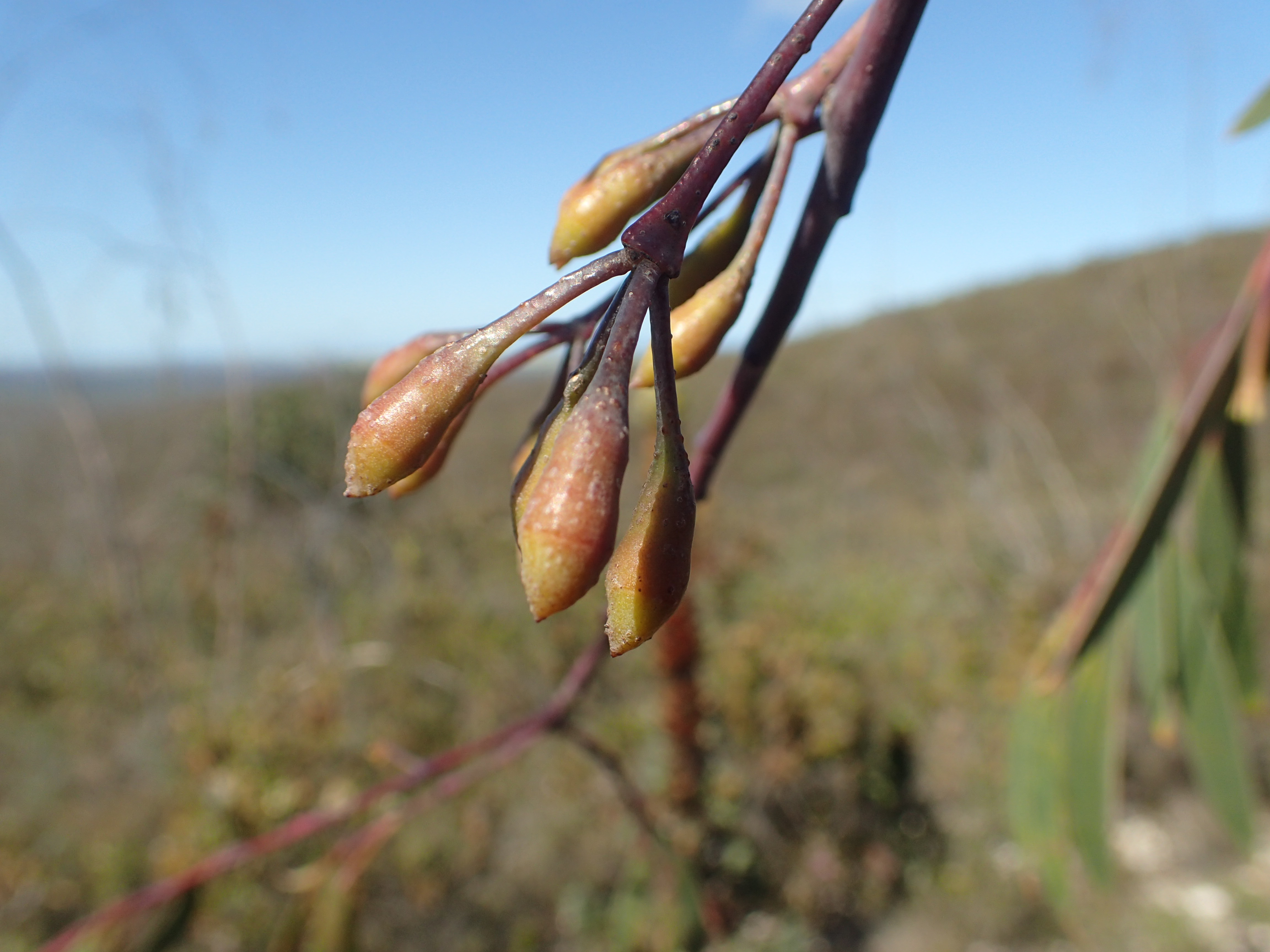
Flower buds

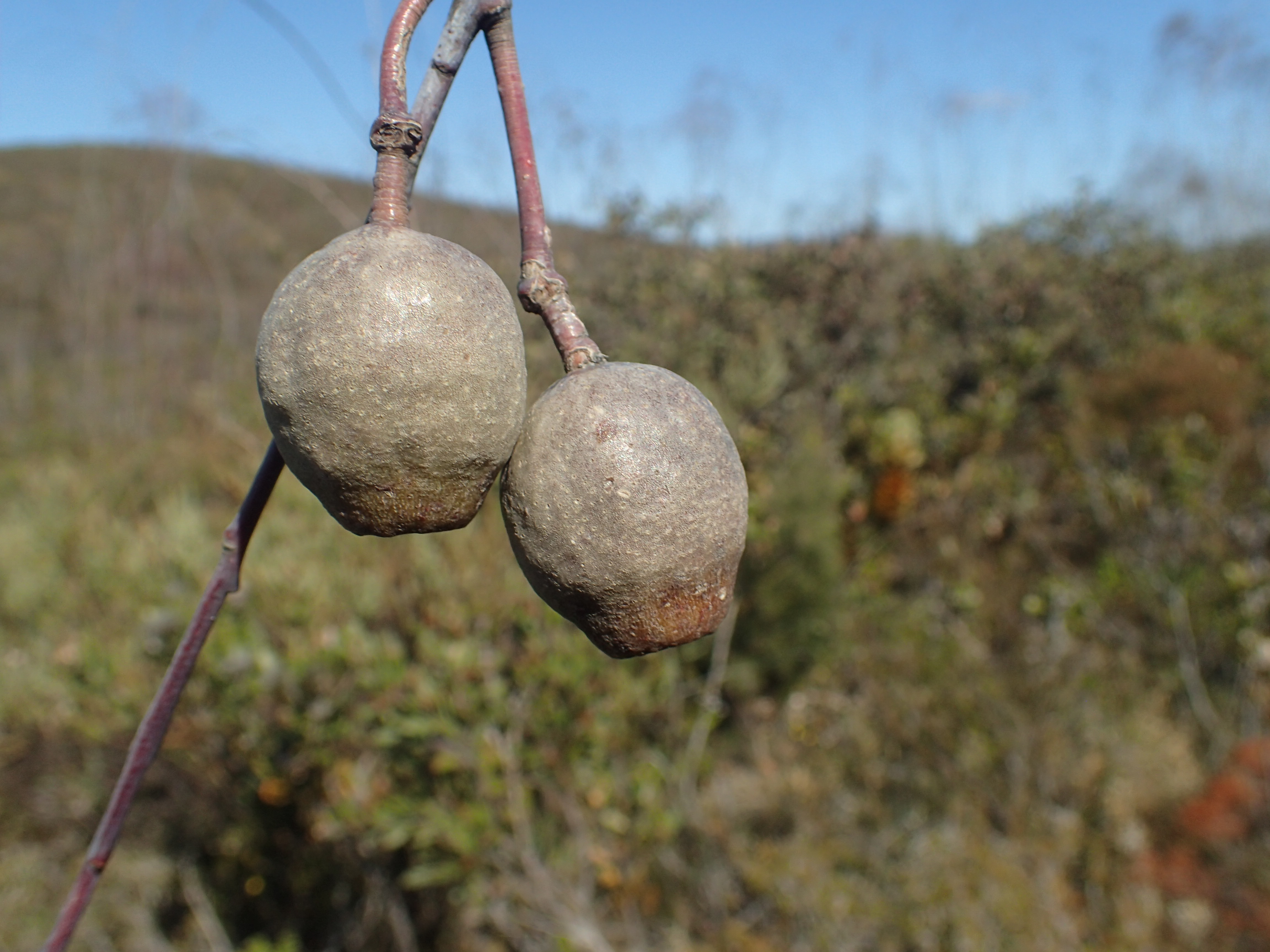
Fruit

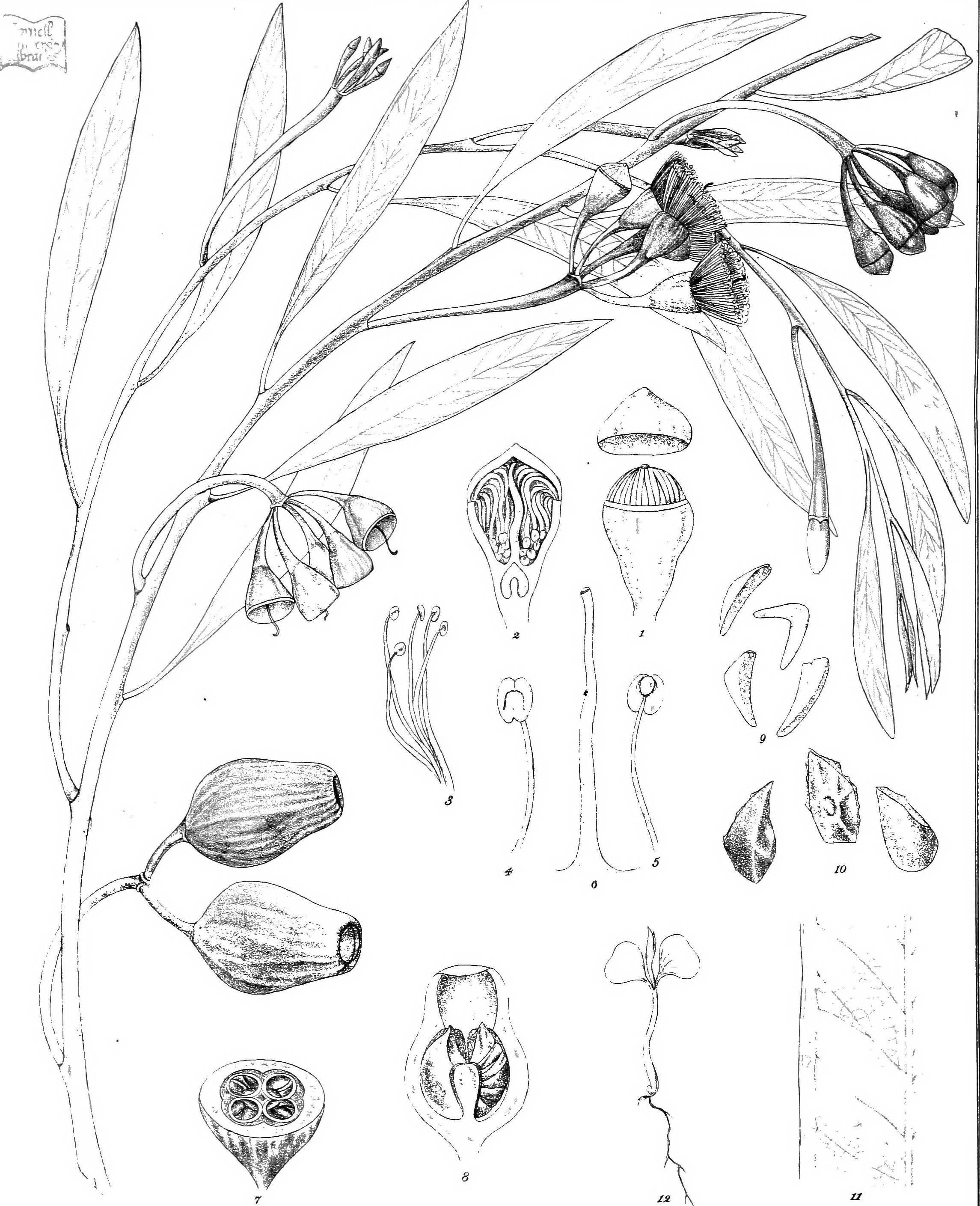
Illustration of E. sepulcralis from Eucalyptographia

Eucalyptus sepulcralis, commonly known as weeping gum or weeping mallee, is a mallee that is endemic to a small area along the southern coast of Western Australia. It has slender stems with smooth bark, narrow elliptical to narrow lance-shaped leaves, flower buds in groups of seven, pale yellow flowers and barrel-shaped to urn-shaped fruit.

== Description ==
Eucalyptus sepulcralis is a slender mallee or tree that typically grows to a height of 3 to 8 metres (10 to 26 ft) and has smooth bark and a slender weeping habit. It blooms between September and February producing inflorescences with yellow flowers. The smooth bark is grey to pinkish grey in colour. It has a light wispy foliage with a light canopy but provides dappled shade beneath. The slender foliage has a silvery coloration. The dull, green, thin, concolorous adult leaves have a disjunct arrangement. The leaf blade has a linear or narrow lanceolate shape and is falcate, acute and basally tapered. Leaves are supported on narrowly flattened or channelled petioles. Each simple axillary conflorescence is made up of three to seven flowered umbellasters supported on narrowly flattened and angular peduncles. It forms obovoid and pruinose buds followed by ovoid to urceolate fruits with depressed discs and enclosed valves.

== Taxonomy ==
Eucalyptus sepulcralis was first formally described by the botanist Ferdinand von Mueller in 1882 in his book, Eucalyptographia.

The species name sepulcralis is Latin for belonging to a tomb, as von Mueller thought the tree would be ideal to plant in and around cemeteries as it weeps like a willow tree. The type specimen was collected by Campbell Taylor (1842–1900) in 1880 near the Thomas River.

== Distribution ==
Weeping gum has a small distribution and is found in the southern Kwongan heathland on hillslopes along the south coast in the Goldfields-Esperance region between Ravensthorpe and Hopetoun, especially throughout the Fitzgerald River National Park where it grows in skeletal sandy quartzite soils. In the low heathland environment it dominates the landscape.

== Conservation status ==
This eucalypt is classified as "not threatened" by the Western Australian Government Department of Parks and Wildlife. It is listed as a least-concern species by the International Union for the Conservation of Nature and has a stable population of approximately 5,000 individual plants, although it is noted the population is severely fragmented.

== See also ==
- List of Eucalyptus species
