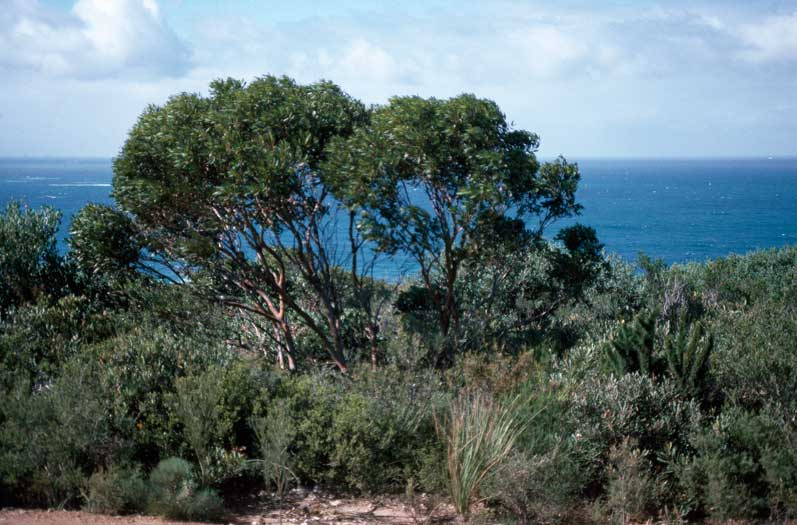
- Eucalyptus burdettiana in the Fitzgerald River National Park

Conservation status
- Endangered (EPBC Act)

Scientific classification
- Kingdom: Plantae
- Clade: Tracheophytes
- Clade: Angiosperms
- Clade: Eudicots
- Clade: Rosids
- Order: Myrtales
- Family: Myrtaceae
- Genus: Eucalyptus
- Species: E. burdettiana

Binomial name
- Eucalyptus burdettiana Blakely & H.Steedman

= Eucalyptus burdettiana =

Burdett gum

Species of eucalyptus

Eucalyptus burdettiana, commonly known as Burdett gum or Burdett's mallee, is a species of flowering plant in the family Myrtaceae and is endemic to Western Australia. It is a mallee or shrub with smooth bark, lance-shaped adult leaves, flower buds with an elongated horn-shaped operculum, greenish-yellow flowers and cup-shaped or bell-shaped fruit.

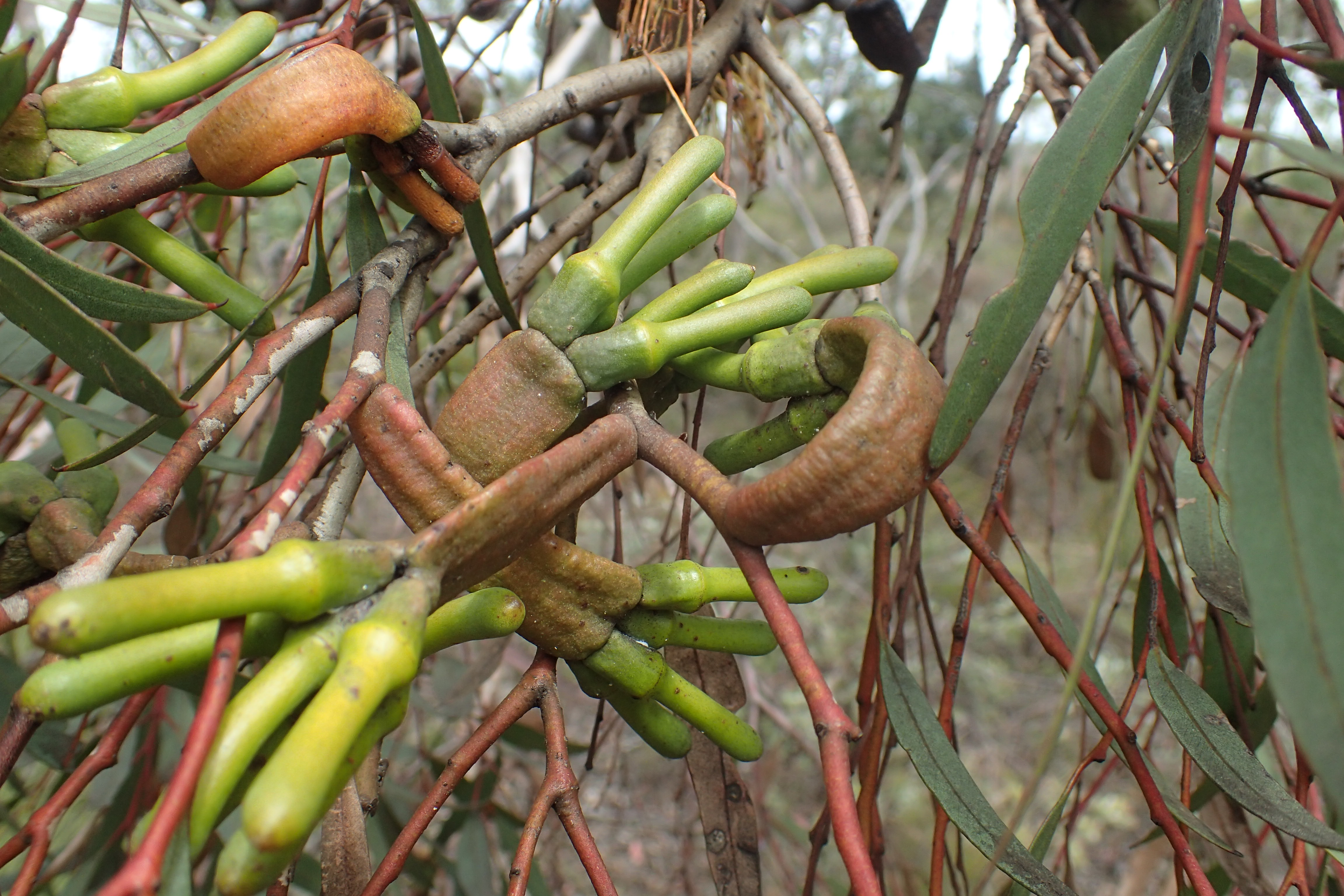
Flower buds

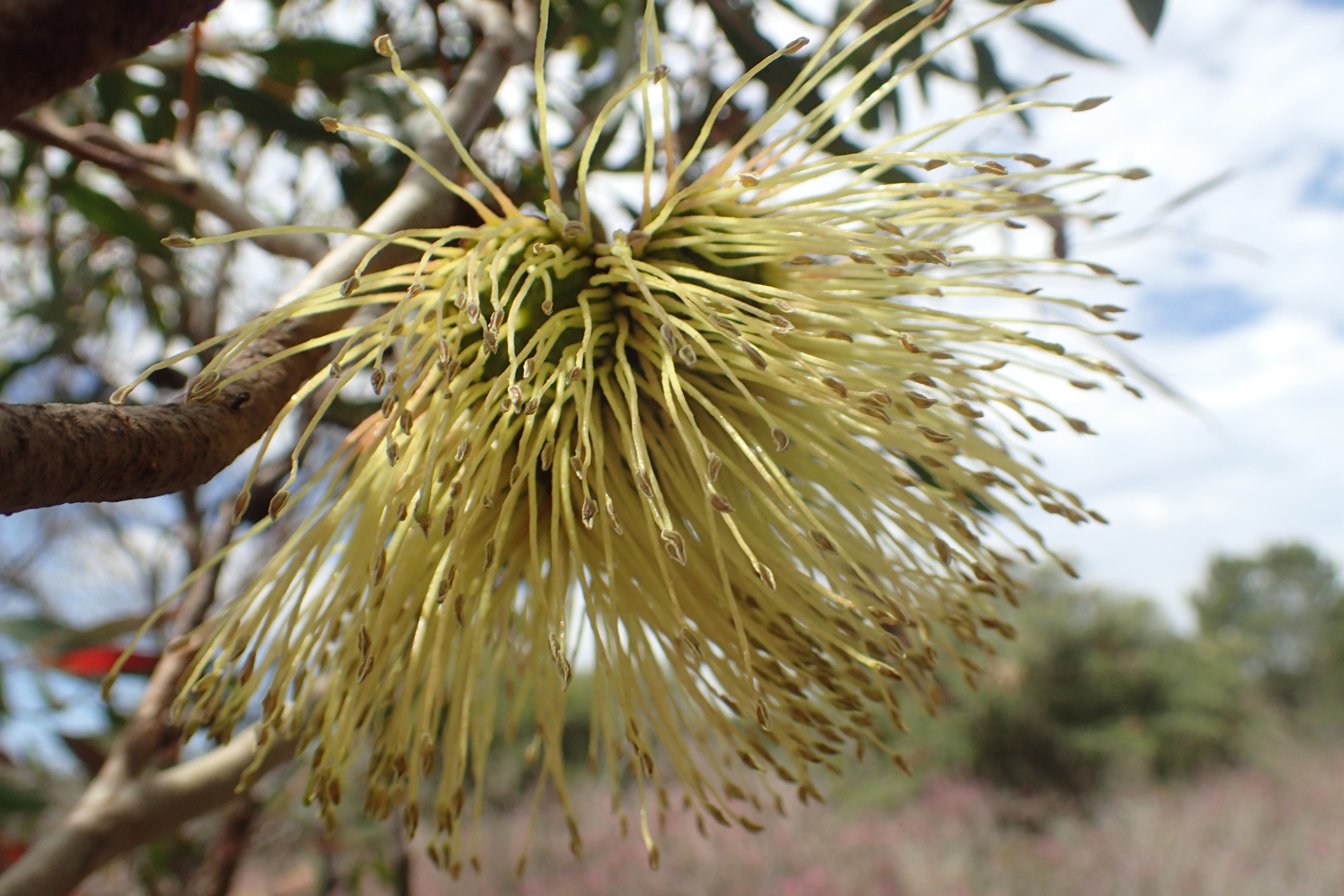
Flowers

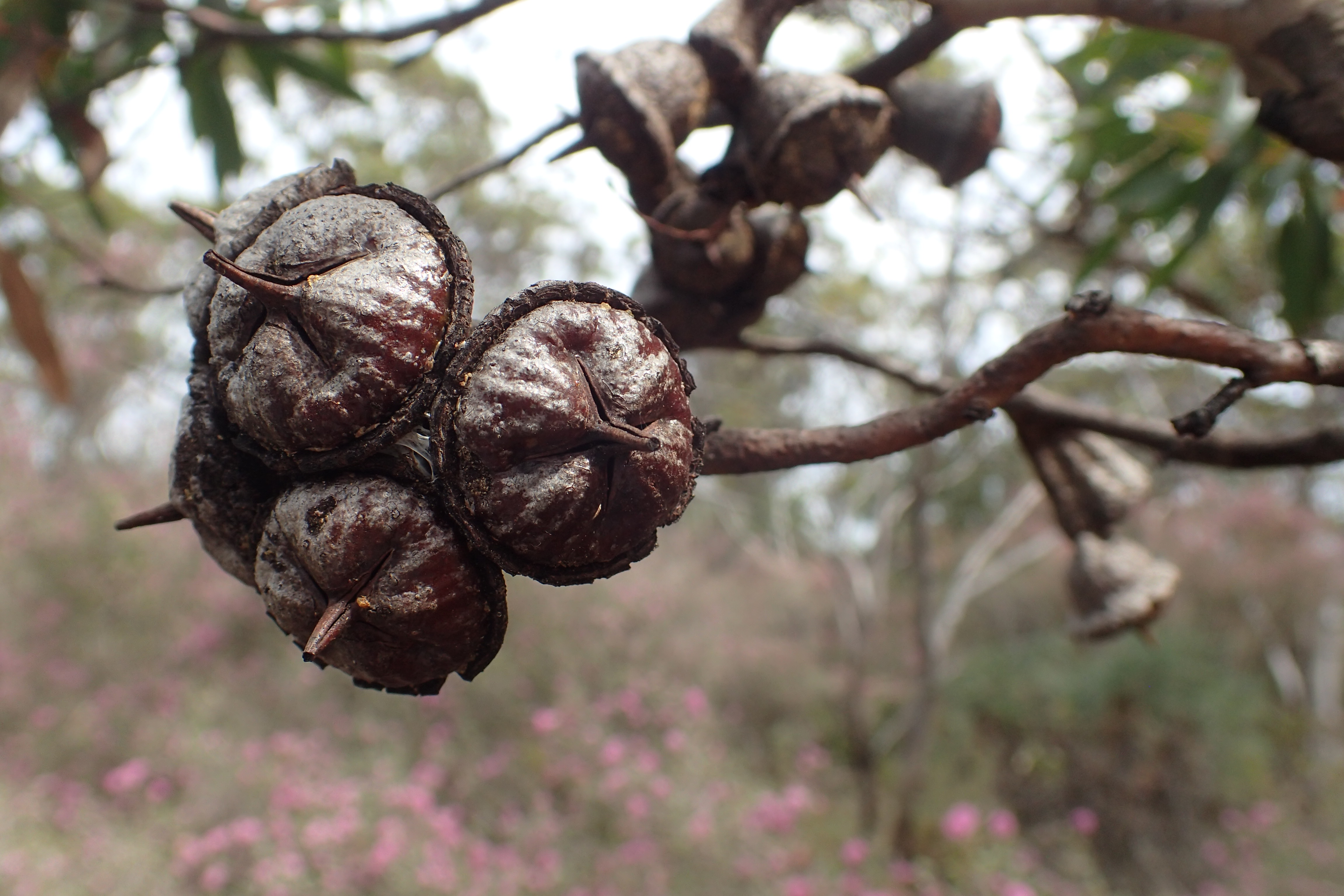
Fruit

== Description ==
Eucalyptus burdettiana is a mallee or shrub that typically grows to a height of 1–4 m (3 ft 3 in – 13 ft 1 in), forms a lignotuber and has smooth, brownish and dark orange bark. Young plants and coppice regrowth have triangular to egg-shaped leaves arranged alternately along the branches, 35–80 mm (1.4–3.1 in) long and 25–60 mm (1–2 in) wide and always have a petiole. Adult leaves are lance-shaped, 65–95 mm (2.6–3.7 in) long, 25–60 mm (1–2 in) wide on a petiole 7–17 mm (0.28–0.67 in) long and are the same glossy green on both sides. The flower buds are arranged in groups of seven, nine or eleven on a flattened, often downturned peduncle 25–50 mm (0.98–2.0 in) long. The individual buds are sessile. The mature buds are cylindrical, 20–58 mm (0.79–2.3 in) long and 4–13 mm (0.16–0.51 in) wide with the operculum three to four times as long as the floral cup. The fruit is a woody, cup-shaped to bell-shaped capsule 19–27 mm (0.75–1.1 in) long and 20–25 mm (0.79–0.98 in) wide on a spreading or downturned peduncle.

== Taxonomy and naming ==
Eucalyptus burdettiana was first formally described by William Blakely and Henry Steedman in 1939 and the description was published in Contributions from the New South Wales National Herbarium from specimens collected by Steedman on stony outcrops of Mount Barren near Hopetoun in 1938. The specific epithet (burdettiana) honours William Burdett (1871-1940) who was a friend of Henry Steedman.

== Distribution and habitat ==
Burdett gum is found on quartzite ridges and rocky areas of the Barren Range in the Fitzgerald River National Park where it grows in sandy soils. The only remaining population is composed of 140 plants split into five sub-populations.

== Conservation ==
This eucalypt is classified as "endangered" under the Australian Government Environment Protection and Biodiversity Conservation Act 1999 and as "Threatened Flora (Declared Rare Flora — Extant)" by the Department of Environment and Conservation (Western Australia). The main threat to the species is inappropriate fire regimes.

== See also ==
- List of Eucalyptus species
