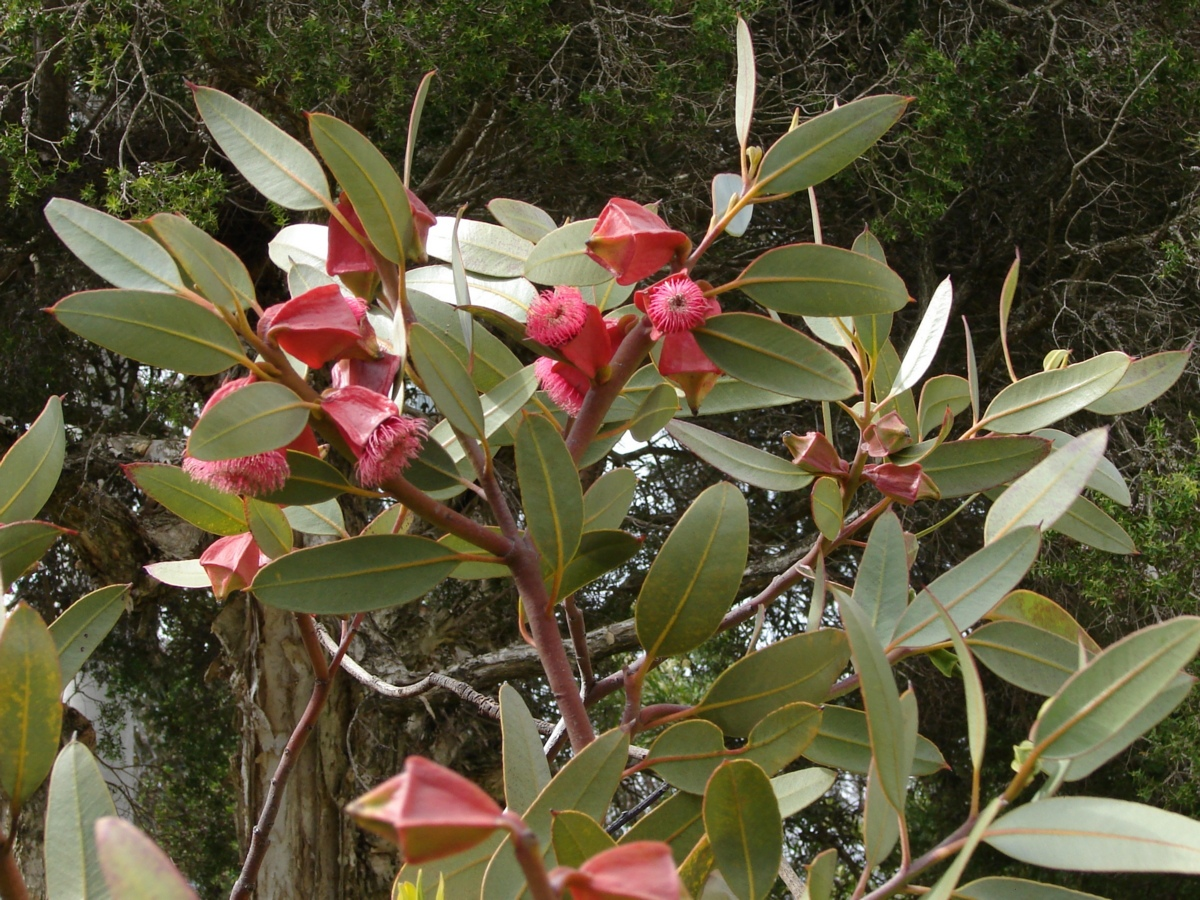
- Eucalyptus tetraptera

Conservation status
- Near Threatened (IUCN 3.1)

Scientific classification
- Kingdom: Plantae
- Clade: Tracheophytes
- Clade: Angiosperms
- Clade: Eudicots
- Clade: Rosids
- Order: Myrtales
- Family: Myrtaceae
- Genus: Eucalyptus
- Species: E. tetraptera

Binomial name
- Eucalyptus tetraptera Turcz.
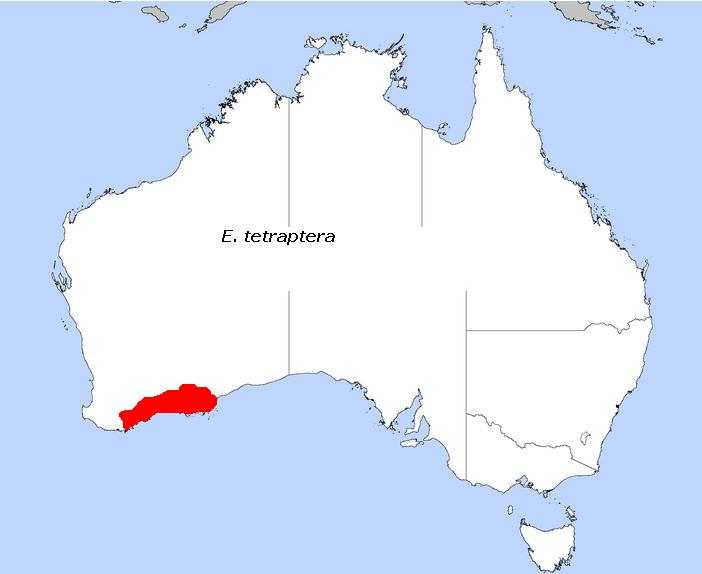
- E. tetraptera, field distribution

Synonyms
- Eucalyptus acutangula Turcz.

= Eucalyptus tetraptera =

Square-fruited mallee

Species of eucalyptus

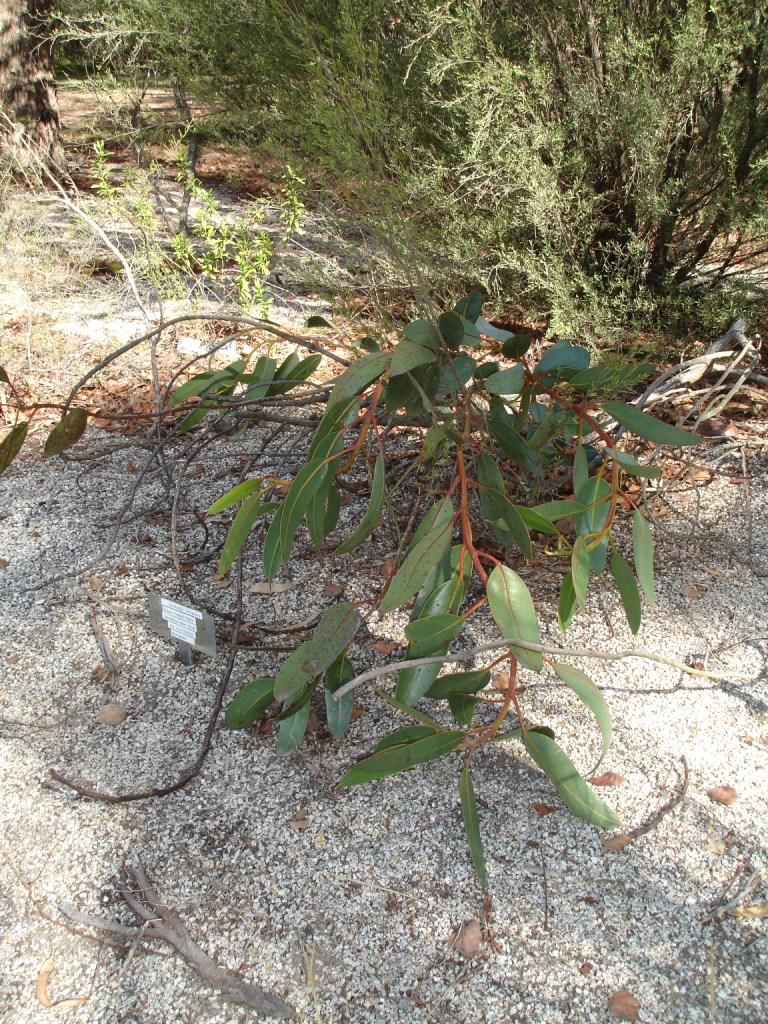
Habit

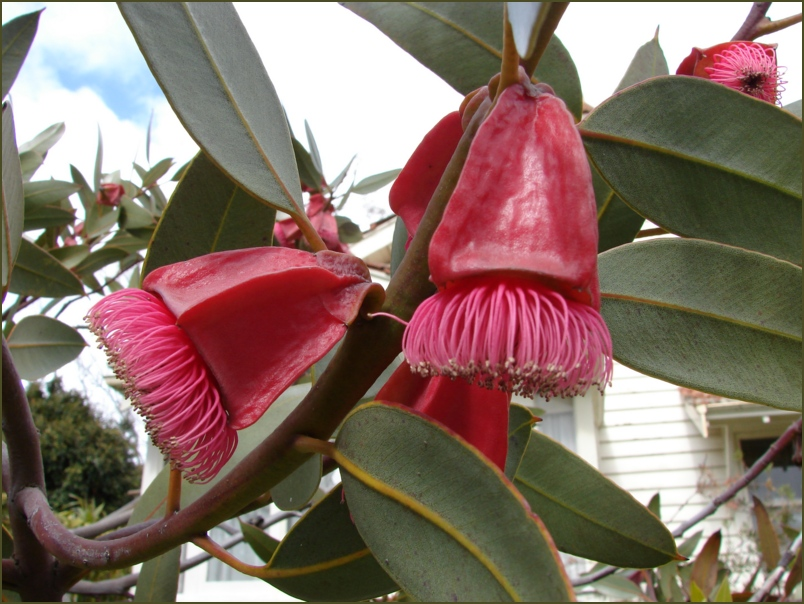
Distinctive conflorescence

Eucalyptus tetraptera, commonly known as square-fruited mallee or four-winged mallee, is a mallee that is endemic to the south coast of Western Australia. It has smooth bark, thick lance-shaped to oblong adult leaves, single flower buds arranged in leaf axils, red to pink flowers and square, prominently winged fruit.

== Description ==
Eucalyptus tetraptera is low, straggly mallee that typically grows to a height of 1–3 m (3 ft 3 in – 9 ft 10 in) and a similar width. It usually has a single low branching trunk with smooth, grey or whitish-grey bark. Young plants and coppice regrowth have egg-shaped to broadly elliptical leaves that are 50–120 mm (2.0–4.7 in) long and 25–70 mm (0.98–2.76 in) wide and petiolate. Adult leaves are arranged alternately, the same shade of glossy green on both sides, thick, lance-shaped to oblong, 90–250 mm (3.5–9.8 in) long and 28–75 mm (1.1–3.0 in) wide, the base tapering to a narrowly flattened petiole 30–45 mm (1.2–1.8 in) long. The flower buds are arranged singly in leaf axils on a rigidly down-turned peduncle 5–60 mm (0.20–2.36 in) long, the peduncle often wider than long. Mature buds are cubic with broad, curved wings, 34–65 mm (1.3–2.6 in) long and 20–40 mm (0.79–1.57 in) wide with a pyramid-shaped operculum 15–30 mm (0.59–1.18 in) long. Flowering occurs from late winter to mid summer and the flowers are red to pink. The fruit is a woody, red, sessile, oblong capsule, 35–55 mm (1.4–2.2 in) long and 25–55 mm (0.98–2.17 in) wide including the wings on each corner.

== Taxonomy and naming ==
Eucalyptus tetraptera was first formally described by the Russian botanist Nikolai Turczaninow in 1849 in the journal, Bulletin de la Société Impériale des Naturalistes de Moscou from specimens collected in 1848 by James Drummond. The specific epithet (tetraptera) is from ancient Greek words meaning "four" and "winged" referring to the fruit of this species.

== Distribution and habitat ==
The distribution of the square-fruited mallee is limited to coastal sandplains where it is also found among granite outcrops of southern Western Australia, north from the Stirling Ranges and south to around Albany east to Israelite Bay in the Great Southern and Goldfields-Esperance regions where it grows in white or grey sandy soils in heath.

== Conservation status ==
This eucalypt is classified as "not threatened" by the Western Australian Government Department of Parks and Wildlife. The IUCN Red List assesses the species as Near Threatened.

== Uses ==
E. tetraptera is one of the most bizarre of the eucalypts with its spectacular, large, red buds and fruit. A popular ornamental, it grows well in full sun in semi-arid climates but is slower growing in cooler climates. It is smog and frost resistant and can be kept in containers. As the plant becomes straggly with age it can be cut back to ground level to rejuvenate. The plant is commercially available as seedlings or as seeds. As for most Eucalypts, the seeds will germinate readily.

== See also ==
- List of Eucalyptus species
