= Black cockatoo =

Black cockatoo is a general descriptive term for cockatoos that are mainly black and may include:

- Palm cockatoo, Probosciger aterrimus, also called great black cockatoo
- Species of the genus Calyptorhynchus:
  - Red-tailed black cockatoo, Calyptorhynchus banksii, has several alternative common names including black cockatoo
  - Glossy black cockatoo, Calyptorhynchus lathami
- Species of the genus Zanda:
  - Yellow-tailed black cockatoo, Zanda funereus
  - Carnaby's black cockatoo, Zanda latirostris
  - Baudin's black cockatoo, Zanda baudinii

== See also ==
- White cockatoo (disambiguation)
