= The Lakes Important Bird Area =

Important Bird Area in Western Australia

Coordinates: 31°53′57″S 116°26′20″E

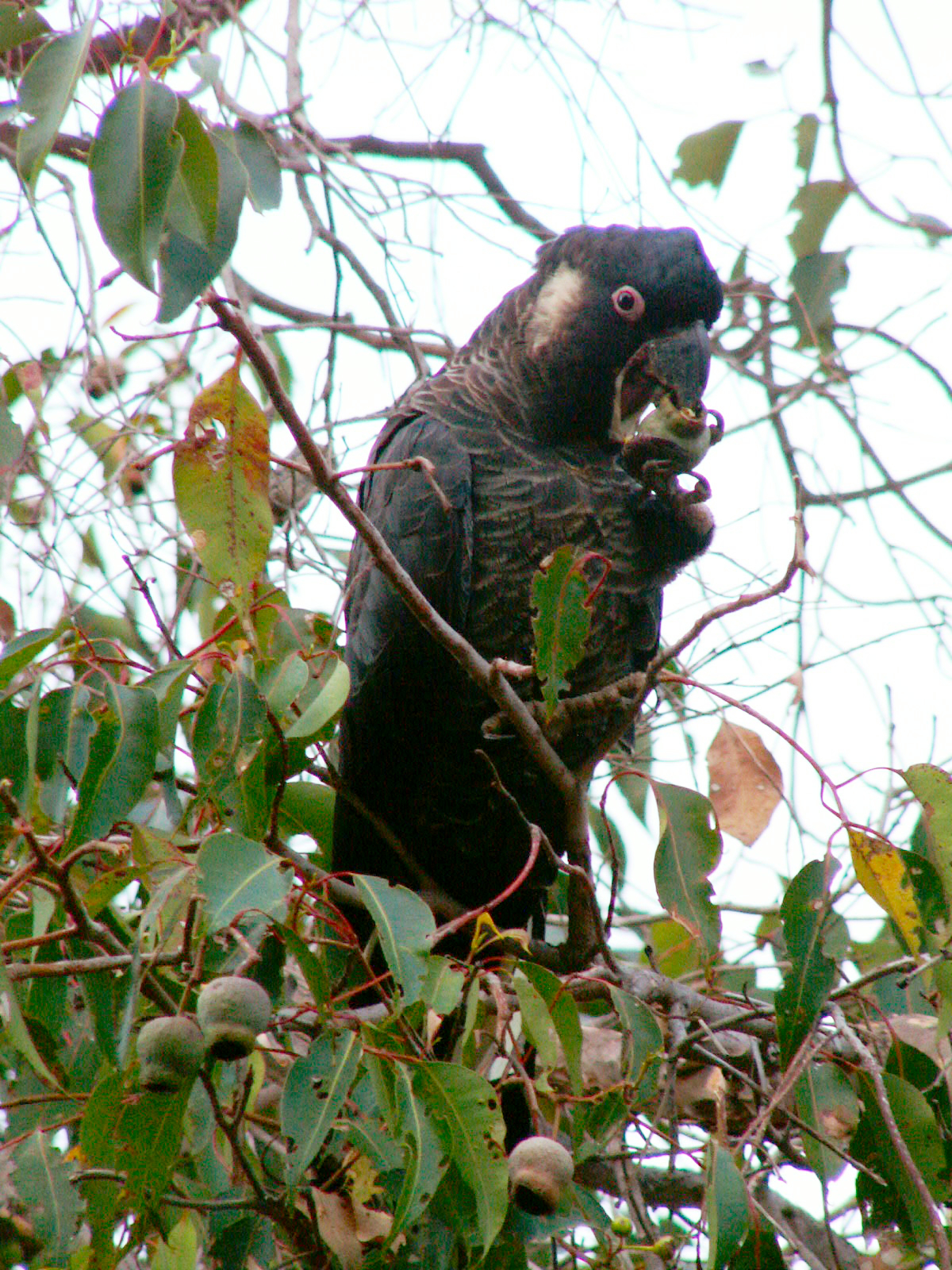
The IBA is an important area for long-billed black cockatoos

The Lakes Important Bird Area comprises some 72 km^{2} of land near the community of The Lakes in the Shire of Mundaring on the eastern fringe of the metropolitan area of Perth, Western Australia. It is an important site for the conservation of threatened Western Australian black cockatoos.

== Description ==
The boundaries of the Important Bird Area (IBA) are defined by blocks of native vegetation greater than 1 ha on private land, state forests, nature reserves, water catchment areas and other reserves within a 6 km radius of non-breeding season roost sites for long-billed black cockatoos. The IBA overlaps part of the Wandoo National Park.

== Birds ==
The site has been identified as an IBA by BirdLife International because it supports at least 370 long-billed black cockatoos, as well as lesser numbers of short-billed black-cockatoos, in roost sites within range of foraging habitat outside the breeding season. The IBA also supports populations of red-capped parrots, rufous treecreepers, western spinebills, western thornbills and western yellow robins.
