= Birdworld (Australia) =

Organization

- Location: Australia
- No. of animals: 2000 birds
- Website: www.birdworld.com.au

Birdworld is one of Western Australia's largest bird parks and dealerships supplying birds all across Australia. It lies east of the city of Perth, Western Australia, close to the airport. Birdworld is set on an acre of park land and has over 120 display cages and flight aviaries, housing some 2000 birds in a natural environment.

== Birds ==
There are some 900 different species of birds, the majority of which are Australian native parrots, cockatoos, lorikeets, quail, pigeons and doves. There is also an extensive range of non Australian birds from most regions of the world. One of the more spectacular sights is the large free flight aviary complex with a large collection of birds able to enjoy significant free flying at all times of the day. Some unusual birds at Birdworld include the popular talking eclectus parrots, Tame black cockatoos and a collection of approximately 50 sun conures and one blue and gold macaw. All of the birds are for sale and provide a great attraction to the public.

== Other attractions ==
There is a retail area at the front of the park selling tame birds and a range of accessories, picnic facilities and a touch and play area where the public is able to interact with a selection of tame birds. A small fish section exists which is being upgraded and expanded.
