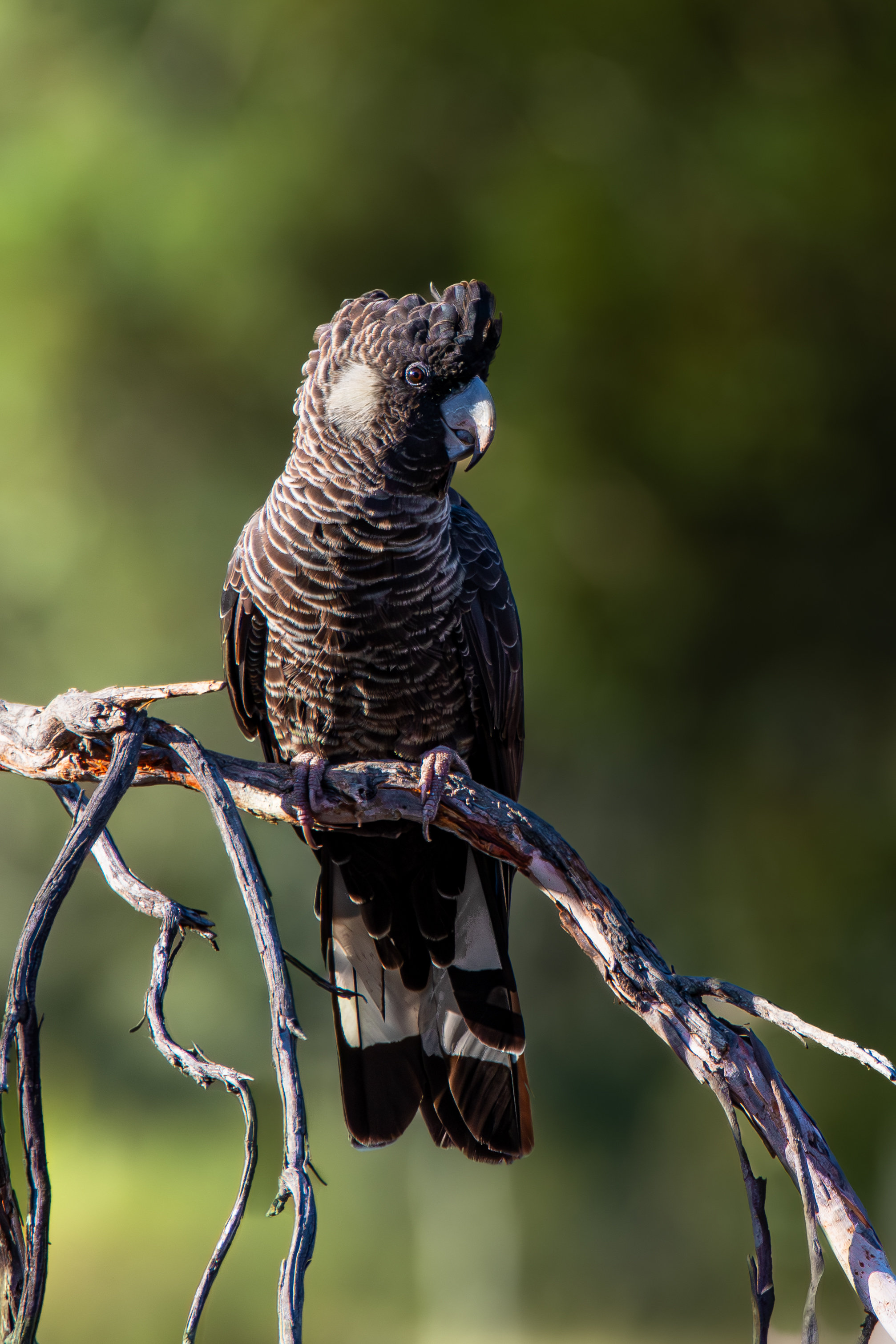
- Baudin's black cockatoo (Female), near Stirling Range National Park
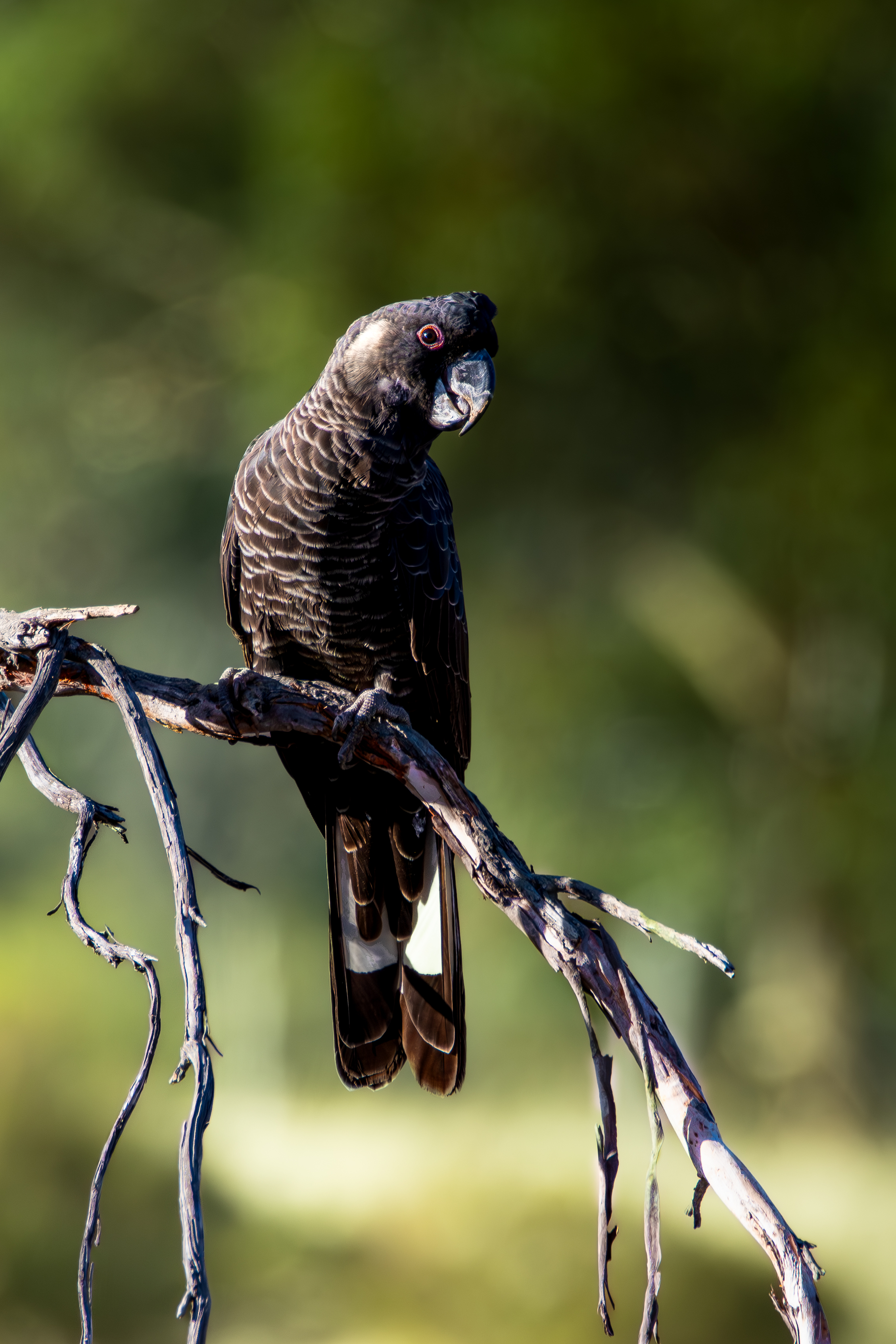
- Baudin's black cockatoo (Male)

Conservation status
- Critically Endangered (IUCN 3.1)

Scientific classification
- Kingdom: Animalia
- Phylum: Chordata
- Class: Aves
- Order: Psittaciformes
- Family: Cacatuidae
- Genus: Zanda
- Species: Z. baudinii

Binomial name
- Zanda baudinii (Lear, 1832)
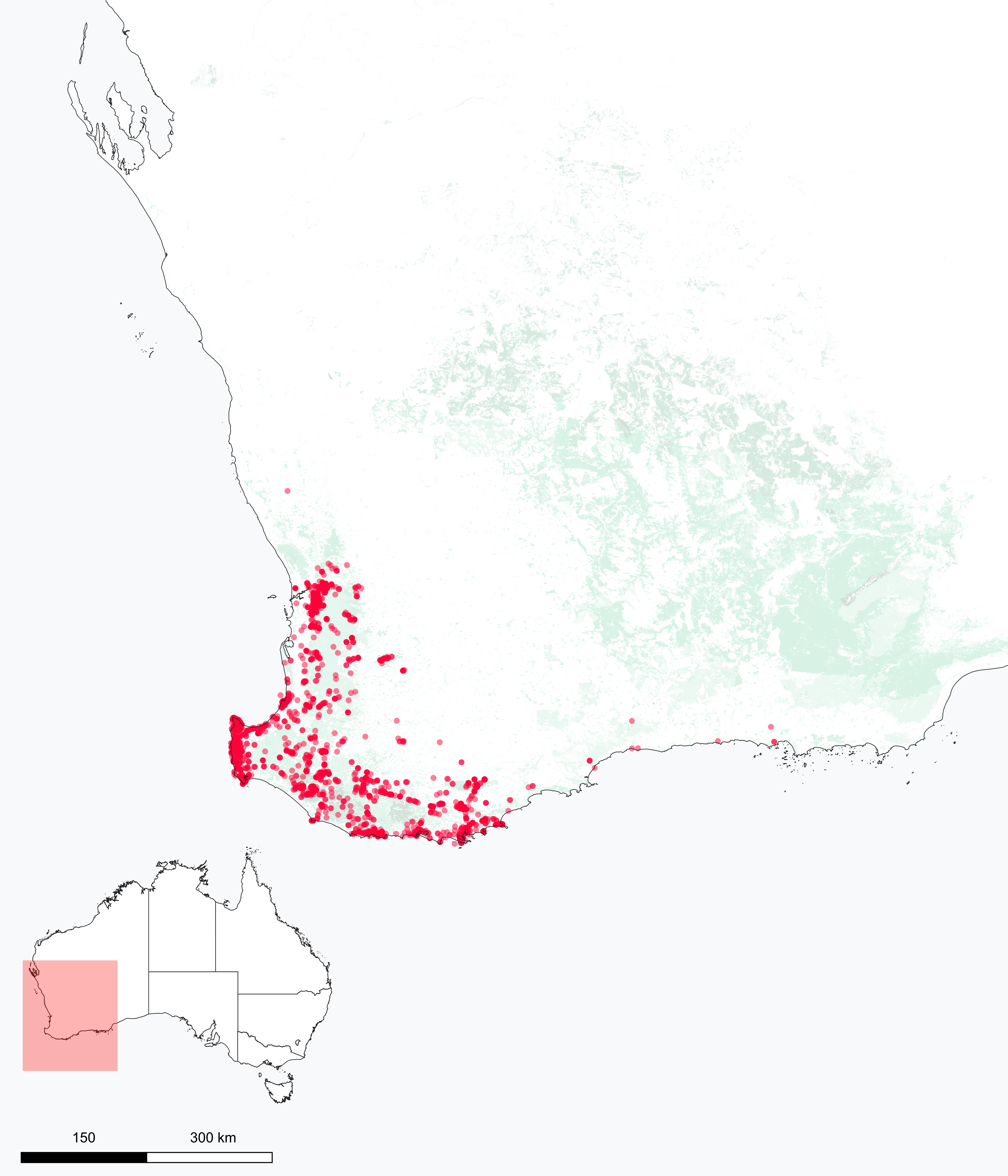
- Range in red, within Australia

Synonyms
- Calyptorhynchus baudinii Lear, 1832; Calyptorhynchus baudinii baudinii Lear, 1832; Calyptorhynchus funereus baudinii Lear, 1832

= Baudin's black cockatoo =

Species of birds

Baudin's black cockatoo (Zanda baudinii), also known as Baudin's cockatoo or the long-billed black cockatoo, is a species of genus Zanda found in southwest Australia. The epithet commemorates the French explorer Nicolas Baudin. It has a short crest on the top of its head, and the plumage is mostly greyish black. It has prominent white cheek patches and a white tail band. The body feathers are edged with white giving a scalloped appearance. Adult males have a dark grey beak and pink eye-rings. Adult females have a bone coloured beak, grey eye-rings and ear patches that are paler than those of the males.

== Taxonomy and naming ==
Baudin's black cockatoo was depicted in 1832 by the English artist Edward Lear in his Illustrations of the Family of Psittacidae, or Parrots from a specimen owned by the naturalist Benjamin Leadbeater. Lear used the common name "Baudin's cockatoo" and coined the binomial name Calyptorhynchus baudinii. The common name and specific epithet commemorate the French explorer Nicolas Baudin, who led an expedition to Australia in 1801-1804. The species is now placed in the genus Zanda that was introduced in 1913 by the Australian born ornithologist Gregory Mathews.

Carnaby's black cockatoo (Zanda latirostris) and Baudin's black cockatoo were previously classified as the same species. Common names include Baudin's black cockatoo or long-billed black cockatoo.

The two Western Australian white-tailed black cockatoo species, the short-billed Carnaby's black cockatoo and this long-billed Baudin's black cockatoo, together with the yellow-tailed black cockatoo Zanda funerea of eastern Australia are allied in the genus Zanda. Previously this genus was considered a subgenus of Calyptorhynchus, with the red-tailed black cockatoo and glossy black cockatoos forming another subgenus, Calyptorhynchus, but due to a deep genetic divergence between the two groups they are now widely treated as separate genera. The two genera differ in tail colour, head pattern, juvenile food begging calls and the degree of sexual dimorphism. Males and females of Calyptorhynchus sensu stricto have markedly different plumage, whereas those of Zanda have similar plumage.

The three species of the genus Zanda have been variously considered as two, then as a single species for many years. In a 1979 paper, Australian ornithologist Denis Saunders highlighted the similarity between the short-billed and the southern race xanthanotus of the yellow-tailed and treated them as a single species with the long-billed as a distinct species. He proposed that Western Australia had been colonised on two separate occasions, once by a common ancestor of all three forms (which became the long-billed black cockatoo), and later by what has become the short-billed black cockatoo. However, an analysis of protein allozymes published in 1984 revealed the two Western Australian forms to be more closely related to each other than to the yellow-tailed, and the consensus since then has been to treat them as three separate species.

== Description ==
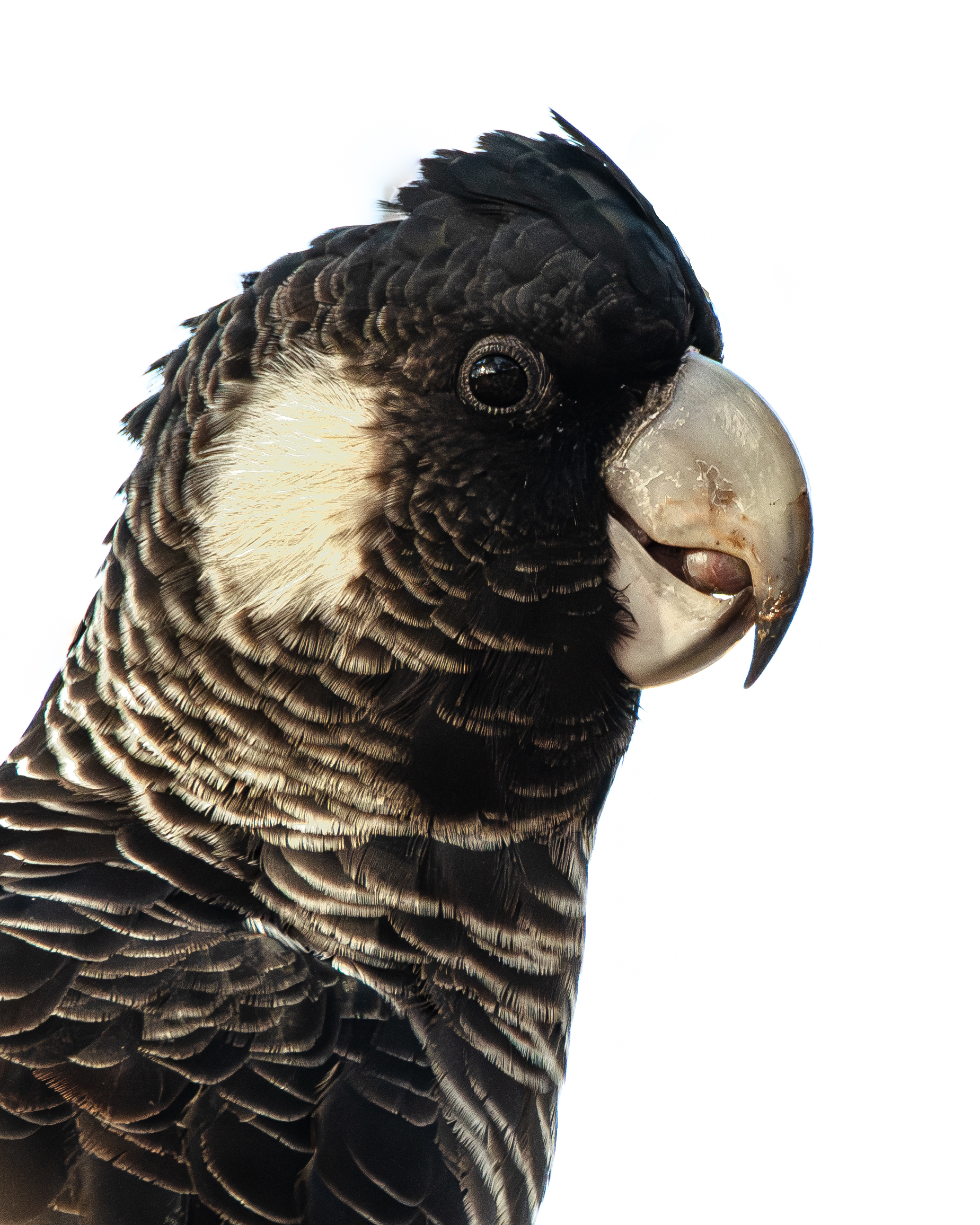
Portrait of a female

Baudin's black cockatoo is about 56 cm (22 in) long. It is mostly dark-grey with narrow vague light-grey scalloping, which is produced by narrow pale-grey margins at the tip of dark-grey feathers. It has a crest of short feathers on its head, and it has whitish patches of feathers that cover its ears. Its lateral tail feathers are white with black tips, and the central tail feathers are all black. The irises are dark brown and the legs are brown-grey. Its beak is longer and narrower than that of the closely related and similar Carnaby's black cockatoo.

The adult male has a dark grey beak and pink eye-rings. The adult female has a bone coloured beak, grey eye-rings, and its ear patches are paler than that of the male. Juveniles have a bone coloured beak, grey eye-rings, and have less white in the tail feathers.

One individual had reached an age of 47 years by 1996.

== Distribution and habitat ==
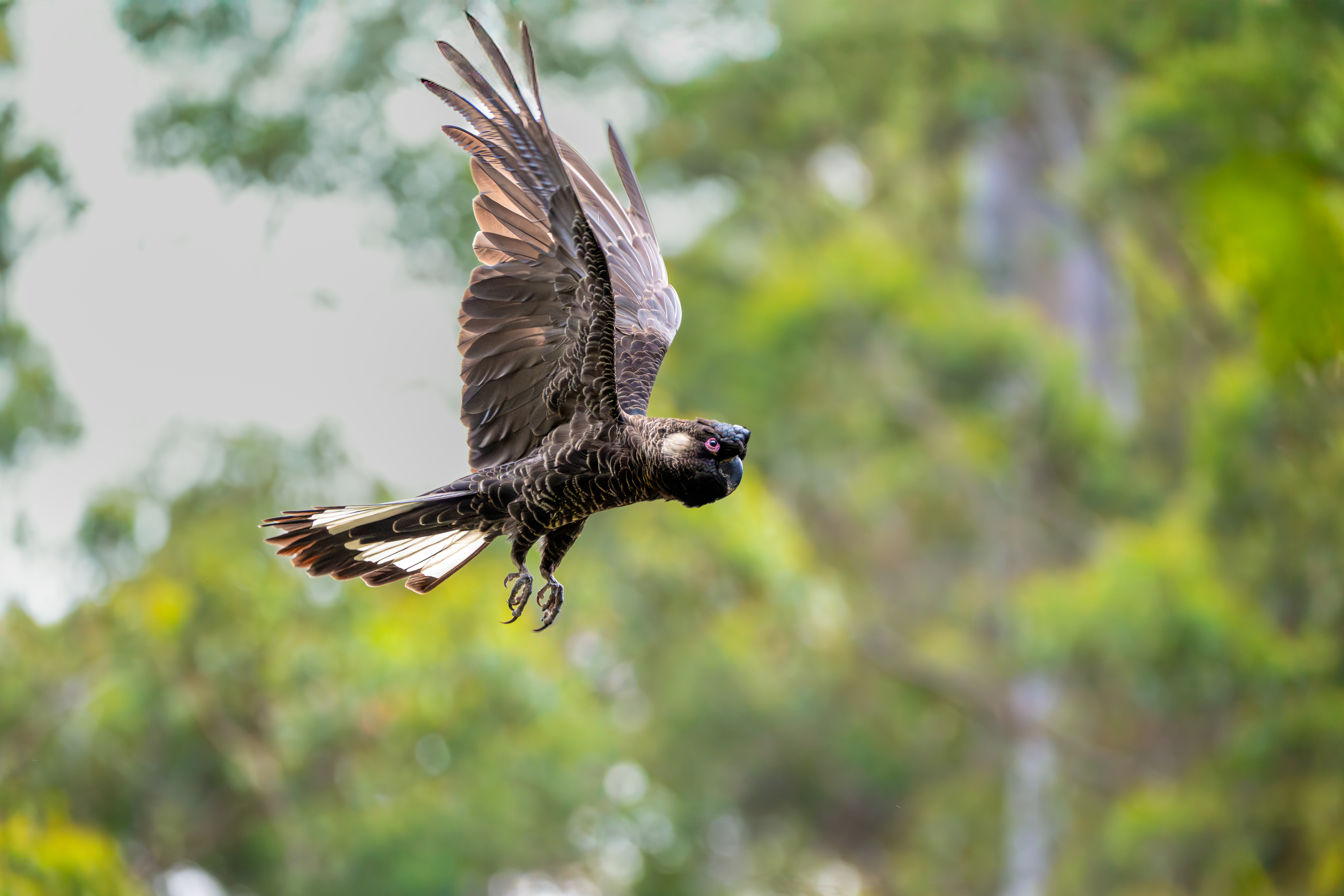
Flying male in Karri forest

The Baudin's black cockatoo is one of two species of white-tailed black cockatoo endemic to south-western Australia which were only separated taxonomically in 1948. It is closely associated with moist, heavily forested areas dominated by marri Corymbia calophylla and is threatened by habitat destruction.

== Conservation ==
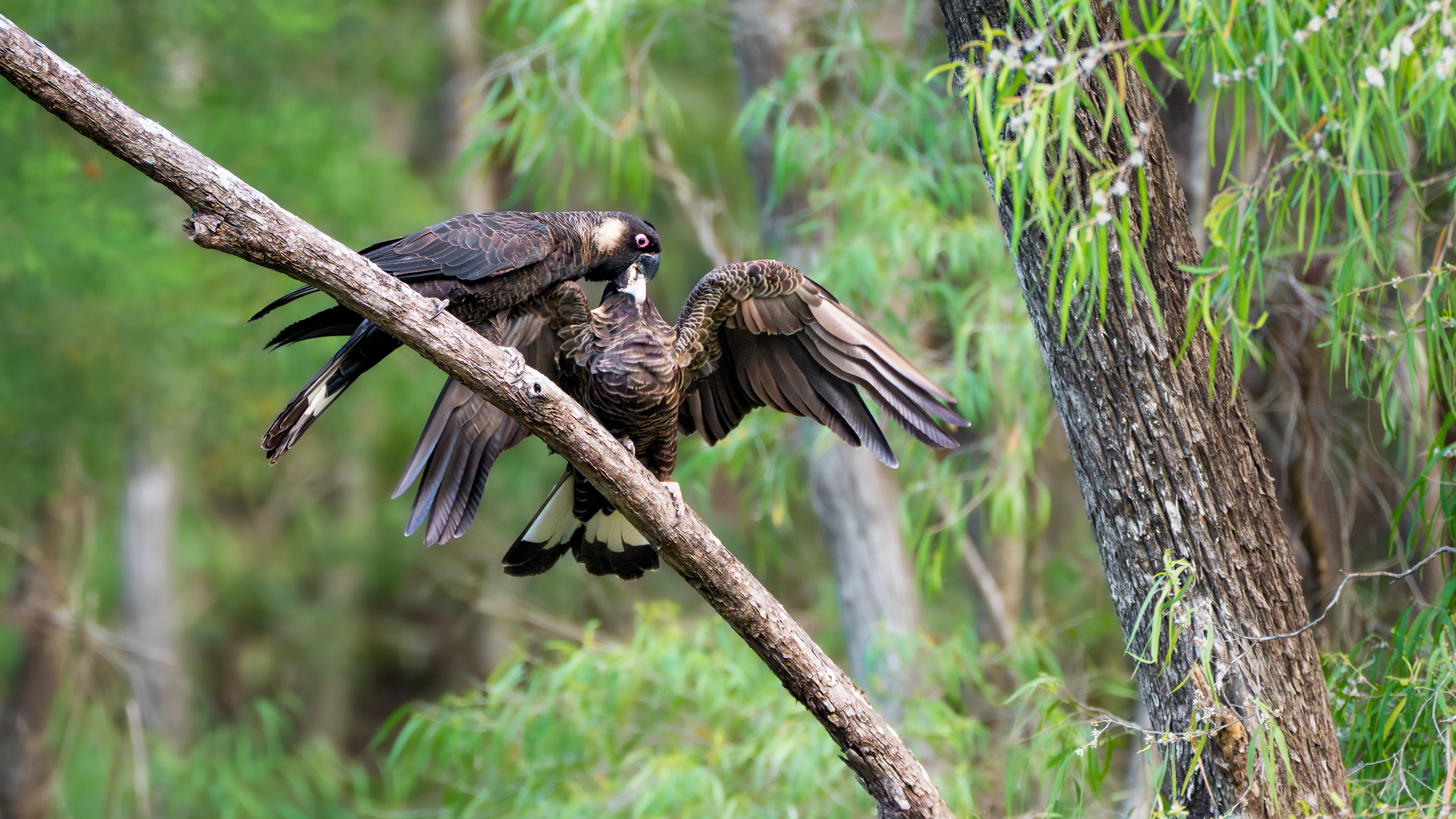
Male feeding juvenile

The range of threats to the declining population, estimated to be between ten and fifteen thousand remaining individuals, has been since 2021 listed with the conservation status of Critically Endangered by IUCN.

The bird is part of an annual census, the Great Cocky Count, that has been held every year since 2009 to track the population change of Baudin's and other black cockatoos.

Sites identified by BirdLife International as being important for Baudin's black cockatoo conservation are Araluen-Wungong, Gidgegannup, Jalbarragup, Mundaring-Kalamunda, North Dandalup, the Stirling Range and The Lakes.

== Gallery ==
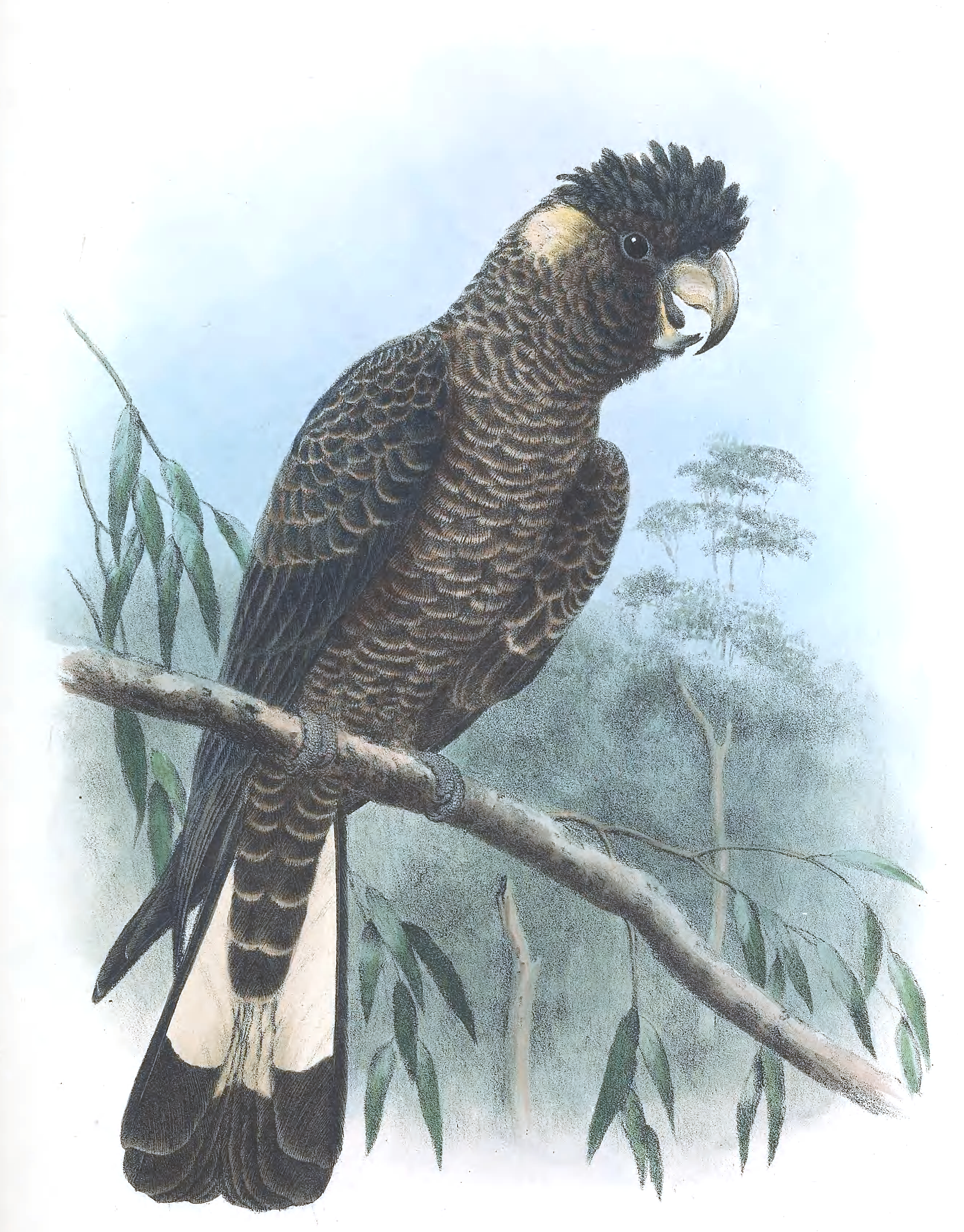
Illustration by Herbert Goodchild, 1916–17

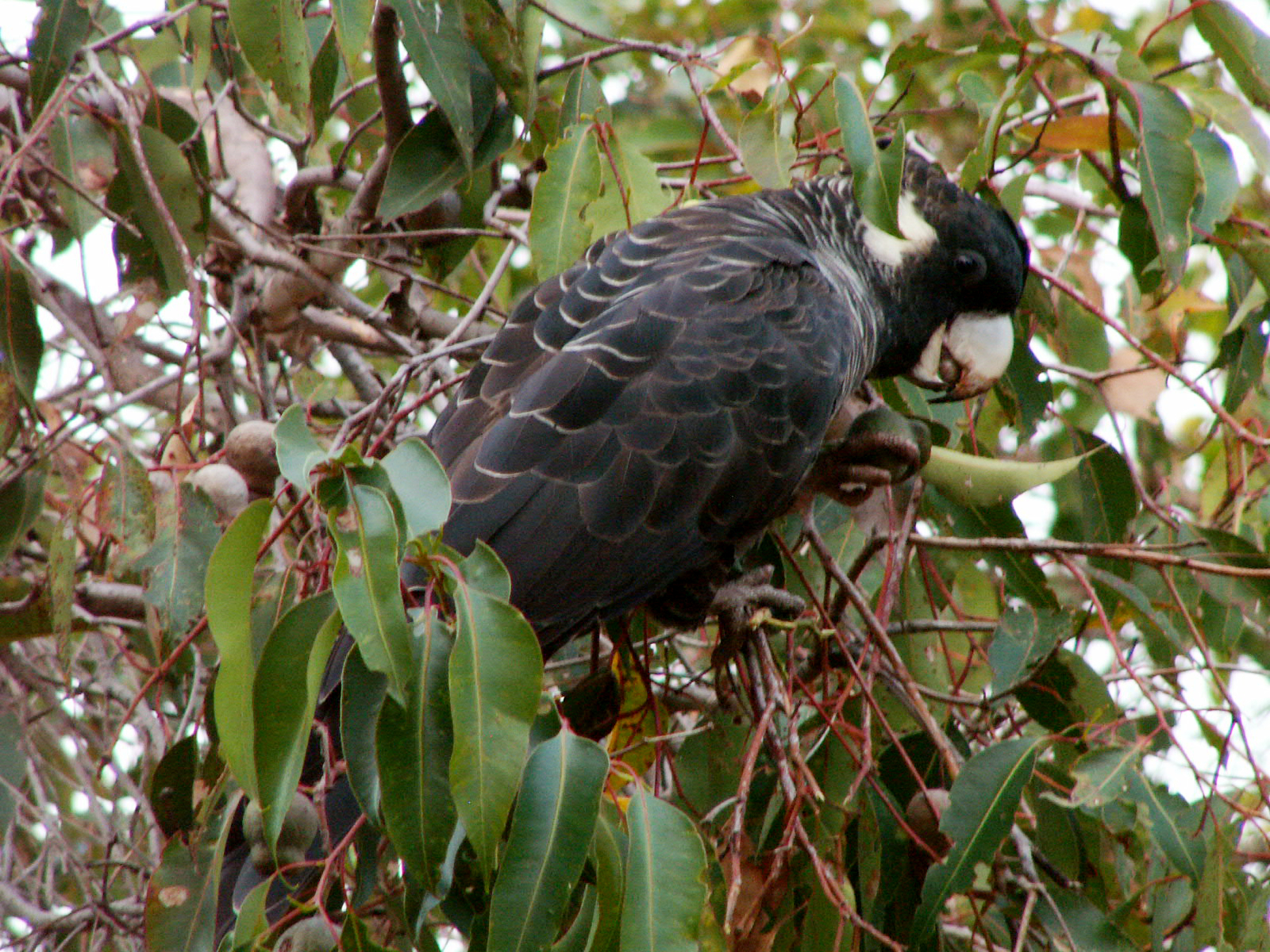
Female ...

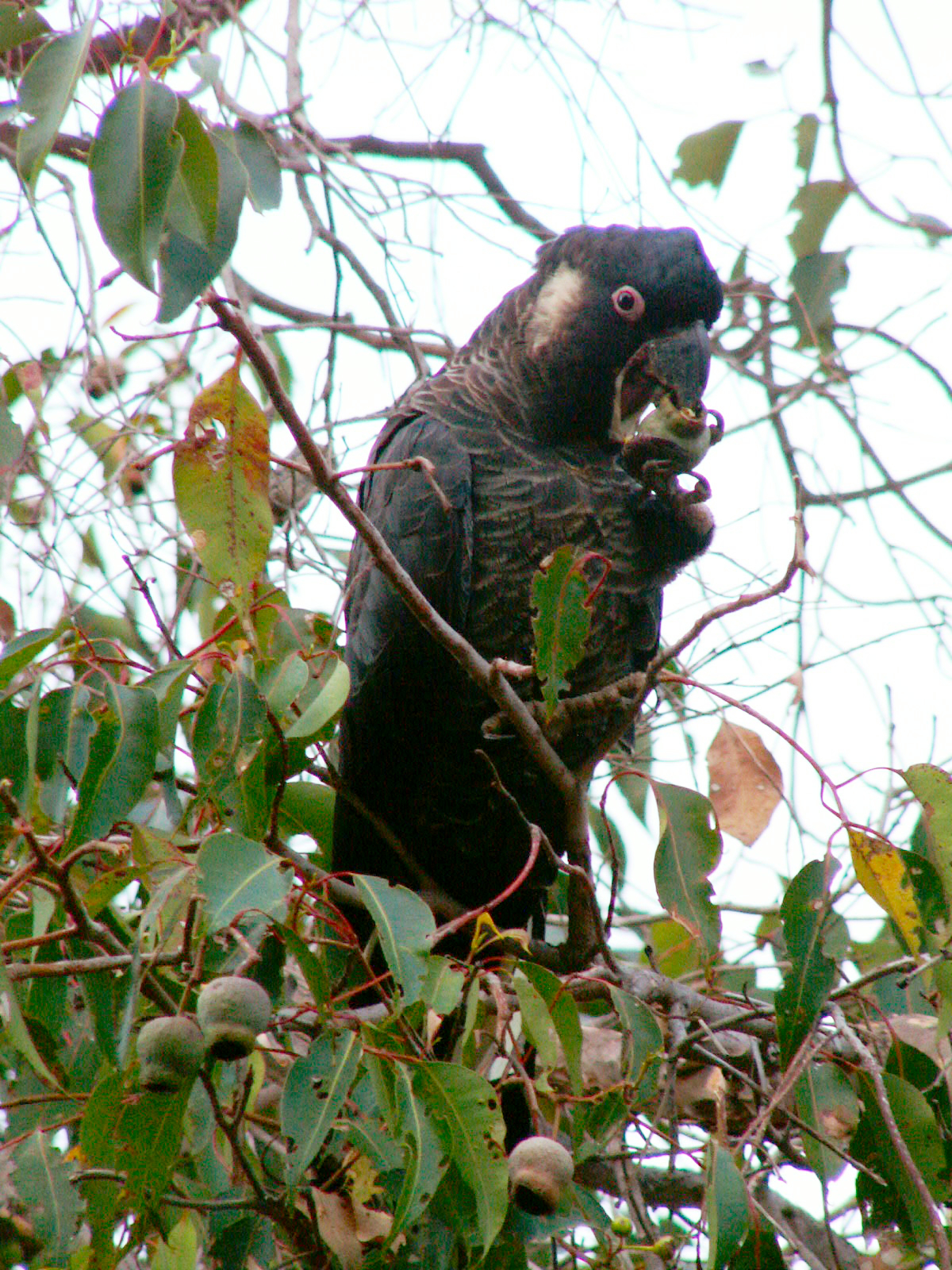
and male at Margaret River, Western Australia

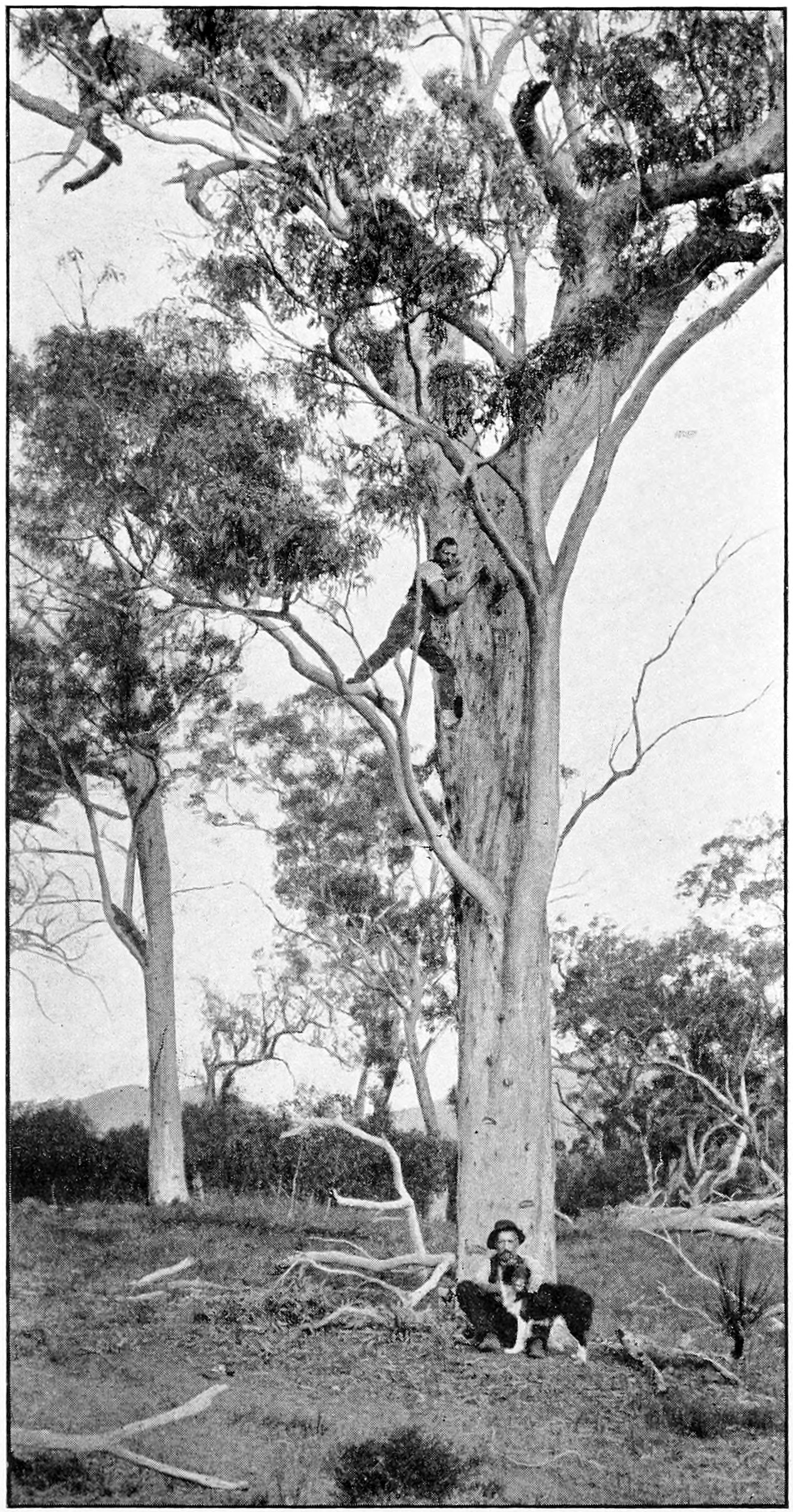
Photo of men taking nest in large tree, Emu, 1903

== Cited texts ==
- Forshaw, Joseph M (2006). Parrots of the World; an Identification Guide. Illustrated by Frank Knight. Princeton University Press. ISBN 0-691-09251-6.
