= North Dandalup Important Bird Area =

Important Bird Area in Western Australia

Coordinates: 32°27′26″S 116°02′29″E

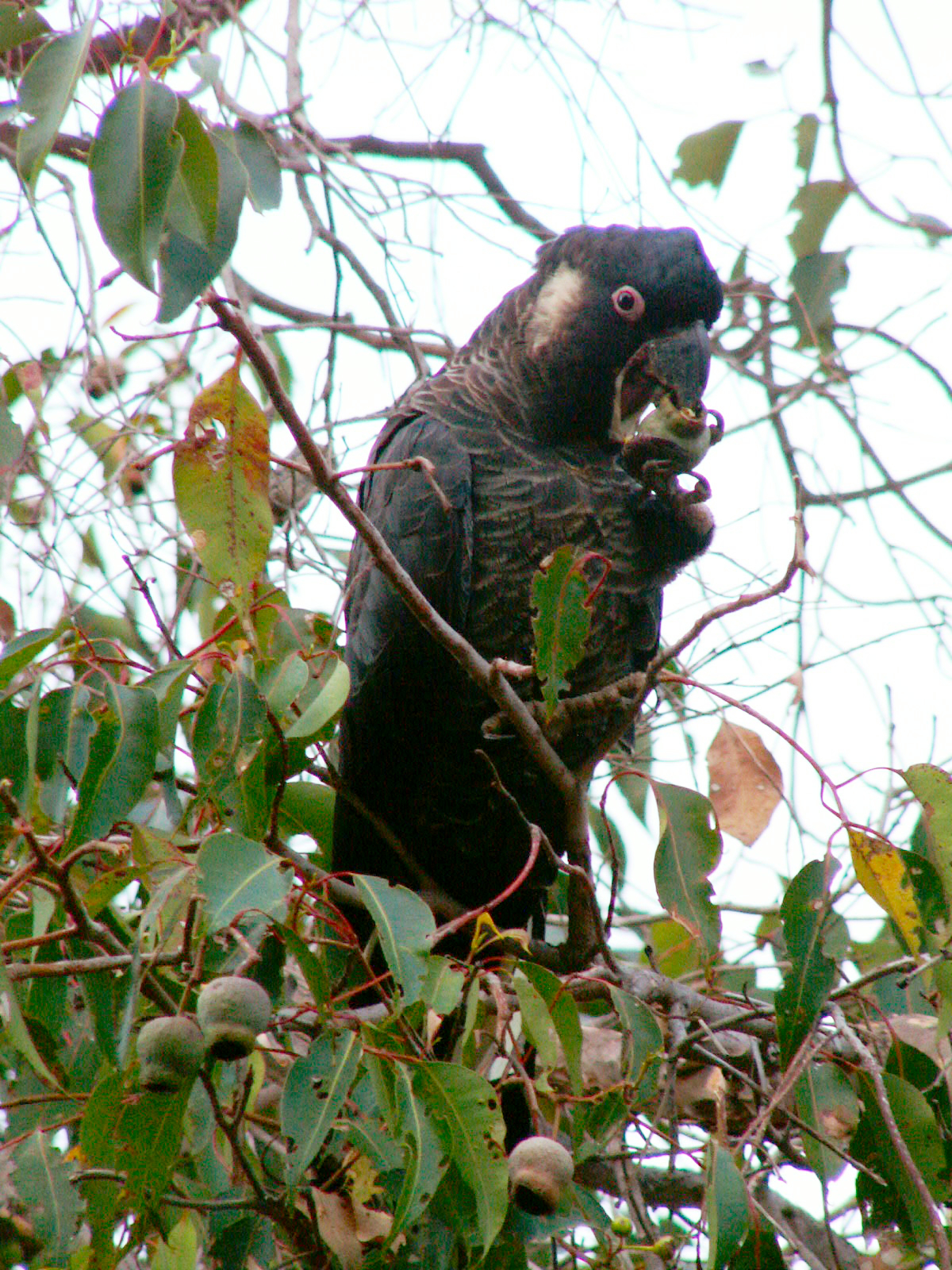
The IBA is an important site for long-billed black cockatoos

North Dandalup Important Bird Area comprises a highly fragmented 76 km^{2} tract of land lying about 50 km south of Perth in the Peel region of south-west Western Australia. It is named after the nearby small town of North Dandalup.

== Description ==
The Important Bird Area (IBA) boundaries are defined by remnant native vegetation, mainly eucalypt open forest and woodland, within a 6 km foraging radius of non-breeding season roost sites for black cockatoos. The IBA consists of all blocks of native vegetation greater than one hectare in water catchment areas, state forests, nature reserves and private land. Part of the IBA lies within the Serpentine National Park. The region has a Mediterranean climate.

== Birds ==
The site has been identified by BirdLife International as an IBA because it supports at least 765 long-billed black cockatoos with roosting sites and associated foraging habitat outside the breeding season, as well as small numbers of short-billed black cockatoos and populations of red-capped parrots, rufous treecreepers, red-winged fairywrens, western spinebills, western yellow and white-breasted robins, and western thornbills. The forest redtail subspecies of the red-tailed black cockatoo (Calyptorhynchus banksii naso) is regularly recorded in the IBA.
