= Araluen-Wungong Important Bird Area =

Important Bird Area in Western Australia

Coordinates: 32°09′54″S 116°05′24″E

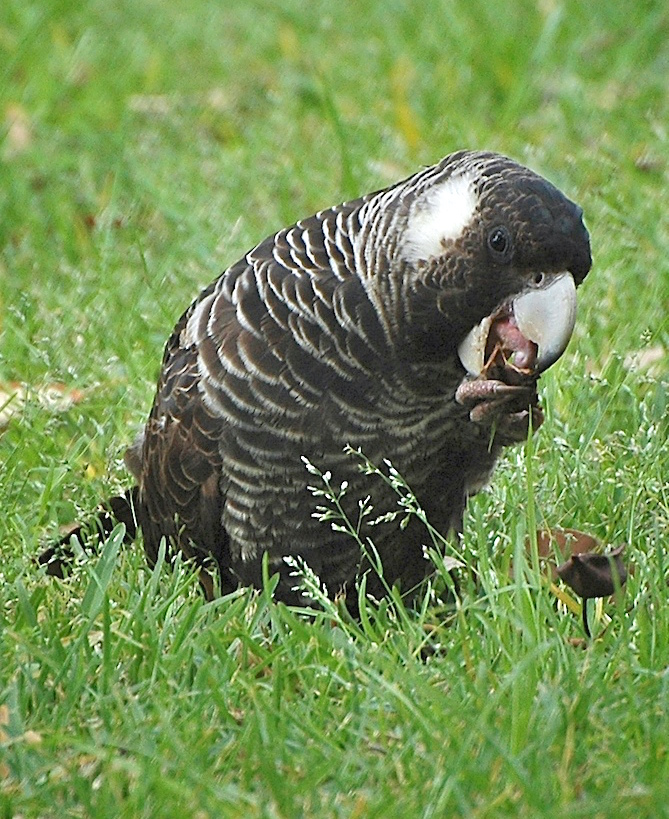
The IBA is important for short-billed black cockatoos during the non-breeding season

The Araluen-Wungong Important Bird Area is a 123 km^{2} tract of land in the Darling Ranges on the south-eastern fringe of the city of Perth, Western Australia. The name derives from the Araluen Botanic Park within the Important Bird Area (IBA), and the adjacent suburb of Wungong. It is an important site for black cockatoos.

== Description ==
The boundaries of the IBA are defined by the presence of blocks of native vegetation larger than 1 ha within a 6 km foraging radius of known non-breeding season roost sites for the black cockatoos. It consists of all such remnant habitat in water catchments, state forests, nature reserves and private land. It includes the Canning National Park and part of the Pickering Brook National Park. Agricultural land is excluded. Threats to the IBA include feral honeybees and illegal shooting by private landowners.

== Birds ==
The site has been identified as an IBA by BirdLife International because it supports at least 1480 long-billed black cockatoos, and up to 450 short-billed black cockatoos, during the non-breeding season at roosts within range of feeding habitat. The forest redtail subspecies of the red-tailed black cockatoo (Calyptorhynchus banksii naso) is a breeding resident. The IBA also contains populations of red-capped parrots, western rosellas, rufous treecreepers, red-winged fairywrens, western spinebills, western thornbills, western yellow and white-breasted robins, and red-eared firetails.
