= Great Cocky Count =

Citizen science project

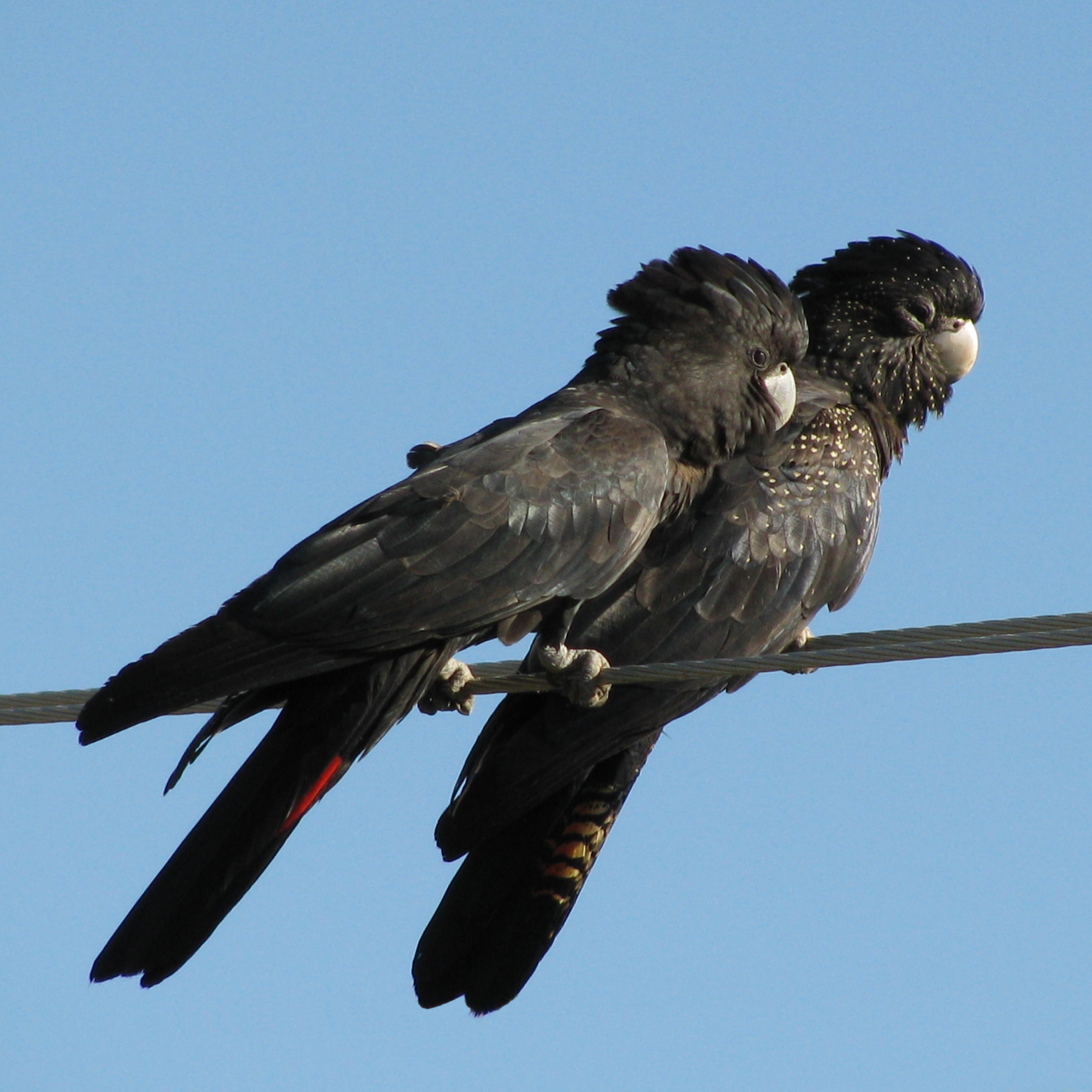
A pair of red-tailed black cockatoos

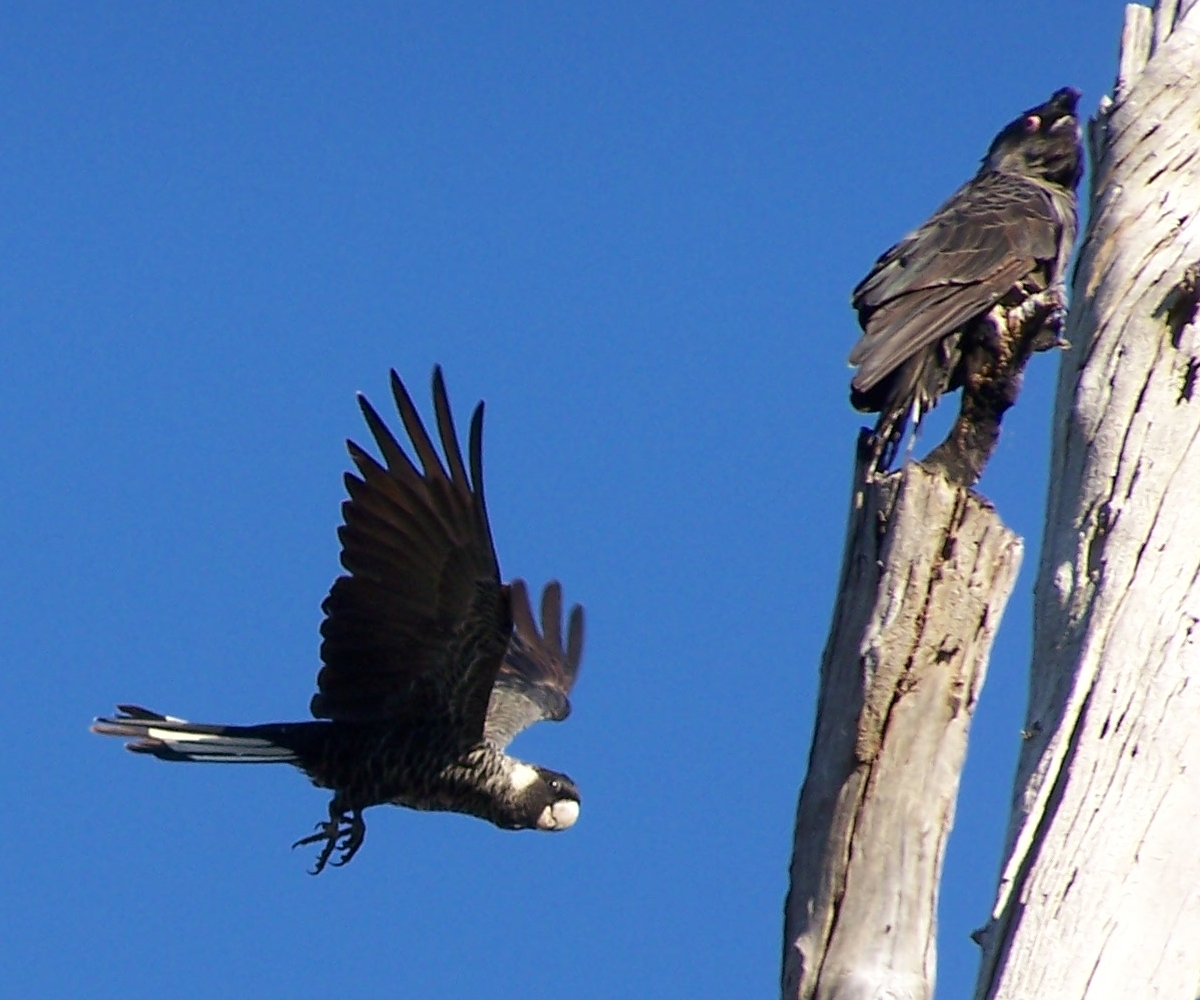
Carnaby's black cockatoos

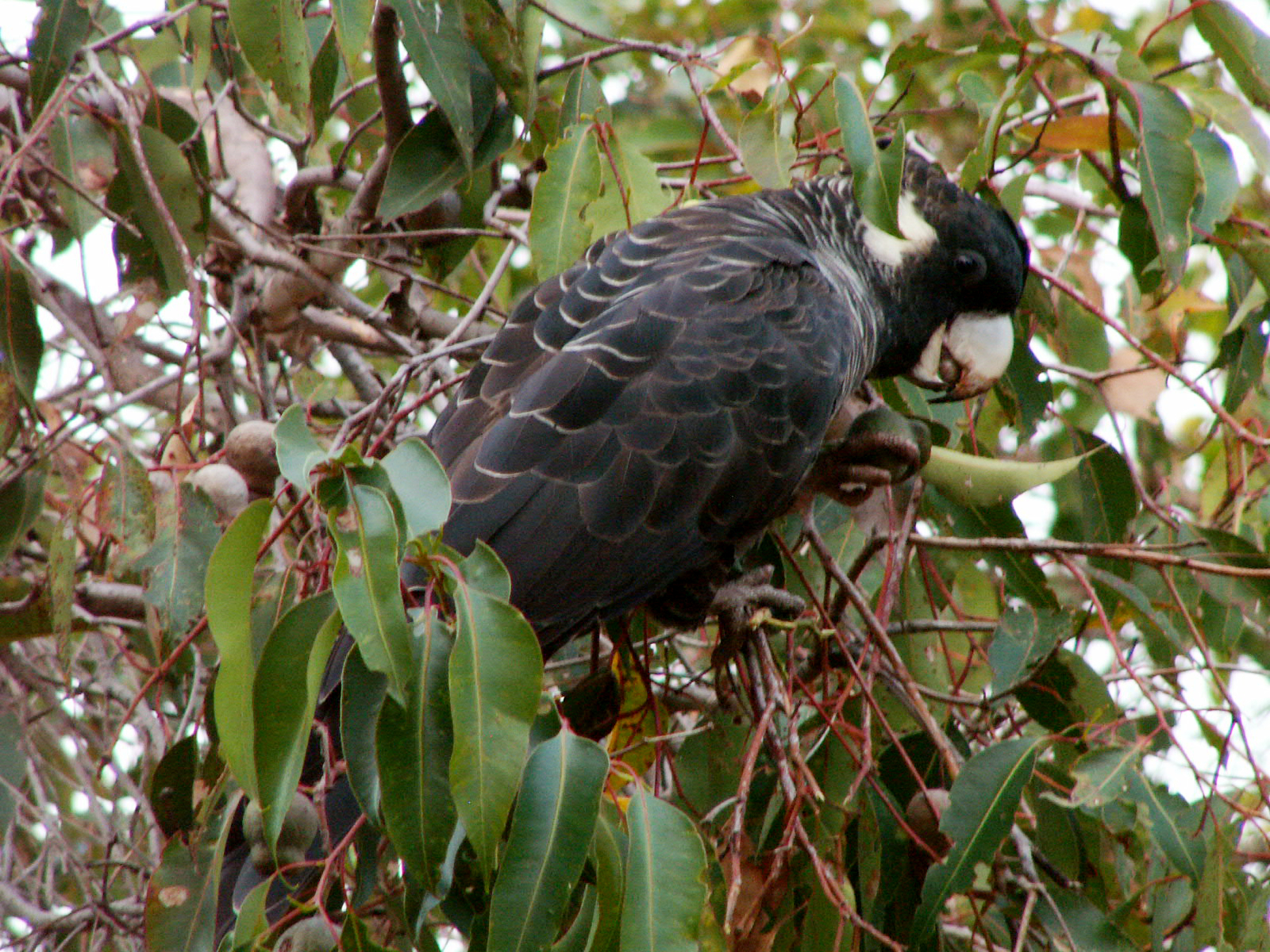
Female Baudin's black cockatoo

The Great Cocky Count is an annual census designed to provide accurate data about the number and distribution of black cockatoos. It is the largest single survey of black cockatoos in Western Australia.

The count is a citizen science survey and is conducted at sunset one night in autumn, usually in early April. It was first held in 2010 and has been conducted each year since apart from 2020 (cancelled due to COVID-19).

Over 700 registered volunteers participated each year at hundreds of locations between Geraldton and Esperance, Western Australia.

The 2019 count had over 700 volunteers surveying over 400 sites, with the endangered Carnaby's black cockatoo being the main focus of the count but the critically endangered Baudin's black cockatoo and vulnerable forest red-tailed black cockatoo also being counted.

In 2016 a total of 426 roost sites were surveyed by approximately 700 volunteers. The results included:

- 16,392 white-tailed black cockatoos recorded at 100 occupied roosts.
- 1,907 forest red-tailed black cockatoos recorded at 66 occupied roosts
- 4,897 Carnaby's black cockatoos were found at a single roost site

It was estimated that 27% of the black cockatoos that inhabit the south west of Western Australia were counted in a single night.

The long-term results from the surveys, which have been conducted since 2010, have found that the Carnaby's black cockatoo population of the Perth-Peel coastal plain declined at a rate of roughly 4 per cent each year. There has been a reduction in flock size and fewer occupied roost sites around Perth, mostly as a result of increased urban sprawl and land clearing. 70% of the population are found in the Gnangara pine plantation, which is scheduled to be cleared by 2025. The reduction in numbers is mostly a result of clearing breeding grounds and reducing their range. Currently the birds are thought to be using all available habitat, which is barely enough to support the population.
