= Bonorong Wildlife Sanctuary =

Wildlife sanctuary in Brighton, Tasmania, Australia

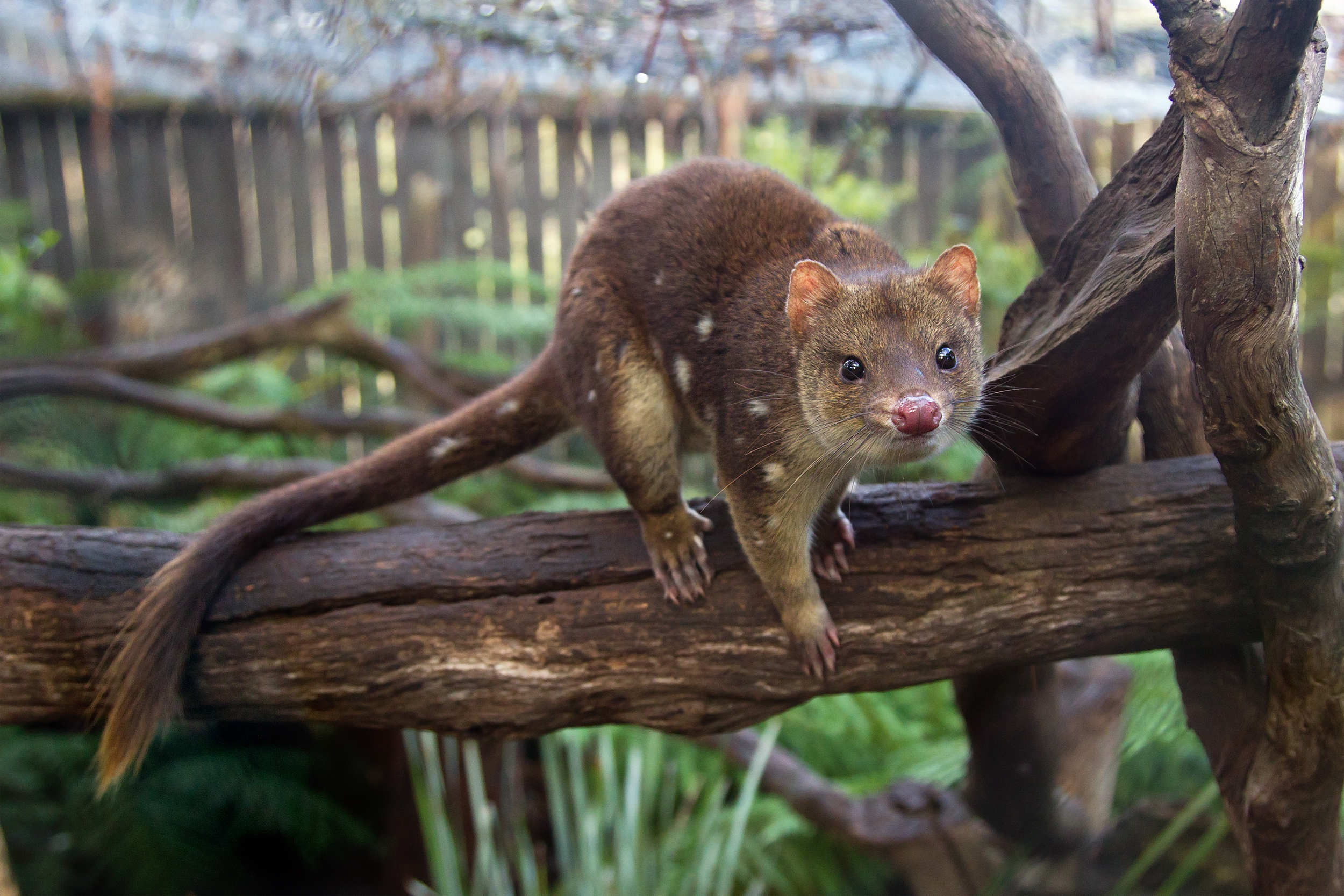
- A spotted-tail quoll at Bonorong, 2012
- Interactive map of Bonorong Wildlife Sanctuary
- Type: Wildlife sanctuary
- Location: 593 Briggs Road; Brighton, Tasmania; Australia
- Coordinates: 42°42′33.19″S 147°16′17.58″E
- Area: 9.7 ha (24 acres)
- Established: 1981; 45 years ago
- Owner: Greg Irons
- Open: 9am-5pm all year 9am-4pm (Christmas Day)
- Parking: On-site
- Public transit: None
- Website: www.bonorong.com.au

Bonorong Wildlife Sanctuary is a 9.7-hectare (24-acre) wildlife sanctuary located in Brighton, Tasmania, Australia. Dedicated to the rescue, rehabilitation, and preservation of native Australian animals, Bonorong actively participates in various conservation projects, contributes to breeding programs, research initiatives, and advocacy for the protection of Tasmania's wildlife. The sanctuary works closely with government agencies, research institutions, and other conservation organisations to make a positive impact on native animal populations. In 2015, the sanctuary received 66,000 visitors.

== History ==
Bonorong Wildlife Sanctuary opened in 1981. Although the sanctuary name is derived from an Australian Aboriginal language meaning 'native companion', the origin of the nation is unknown.

== Friends of Bonorong ==
Friends of Bonorong is a registered charity associated with the sanctuary. Friends of Bonorong provides funding for urgent assistance to wildlife in crisis and to support long-term conservation through corporate donations, ongoing partnerships, and personal contributions.

== Bonorong Wildlife Rescue ==
Opening in 2018, Bonorong Wildlife Rescue became Tasmania's first veterinary hospital dedicated to wildlife.

== Animals ==
On average, the sanctuary contains about 200 animals from 25 different species including eastern grey kangaroos, Tasmanian devils, wombats, sugar gliders, eastern quolls, sulphur-crested cockatoos, yellow-tailed black cockatoos, tawny frogmouths, echidnas and eastern bettongs.

== Access ==
Bonorong Wildlife Sanctuary is accessible via Briggs Road, Brighton with car parking on site. A private bus service called the Bonorong Shuttle departs from the Hobart central business district twice daily.

== Sources ==
- Bonorong Park Wildlife Centre (Tas.) (2015). Empowering Wildlife Experiences: Bonorong Wildlife Sanctuary. Bonorong Wildlife Sanctuary.
- Jungalwalla, Tanaz; Knott, Andrew (2019). Bonorong: The Critters of Bonorong Sanctuary (2nd ed.). Greg Irons, Tanaz Jungalwalla and Andrew Knott. ISBN 9780987180605.
- "10 Questions Greg Irons, Bonorong Wildlife Sanctuary director, 29.", The Australian (Magazine), Sydney, Australia: News Corp Australia: 6, 2013-02-16, ISSN 0313-4598
