= Gidgegannup Important Bird Area =

Important Bird Area in Western Australia

Coordinates: 31°49′17″S 116°09′12″E

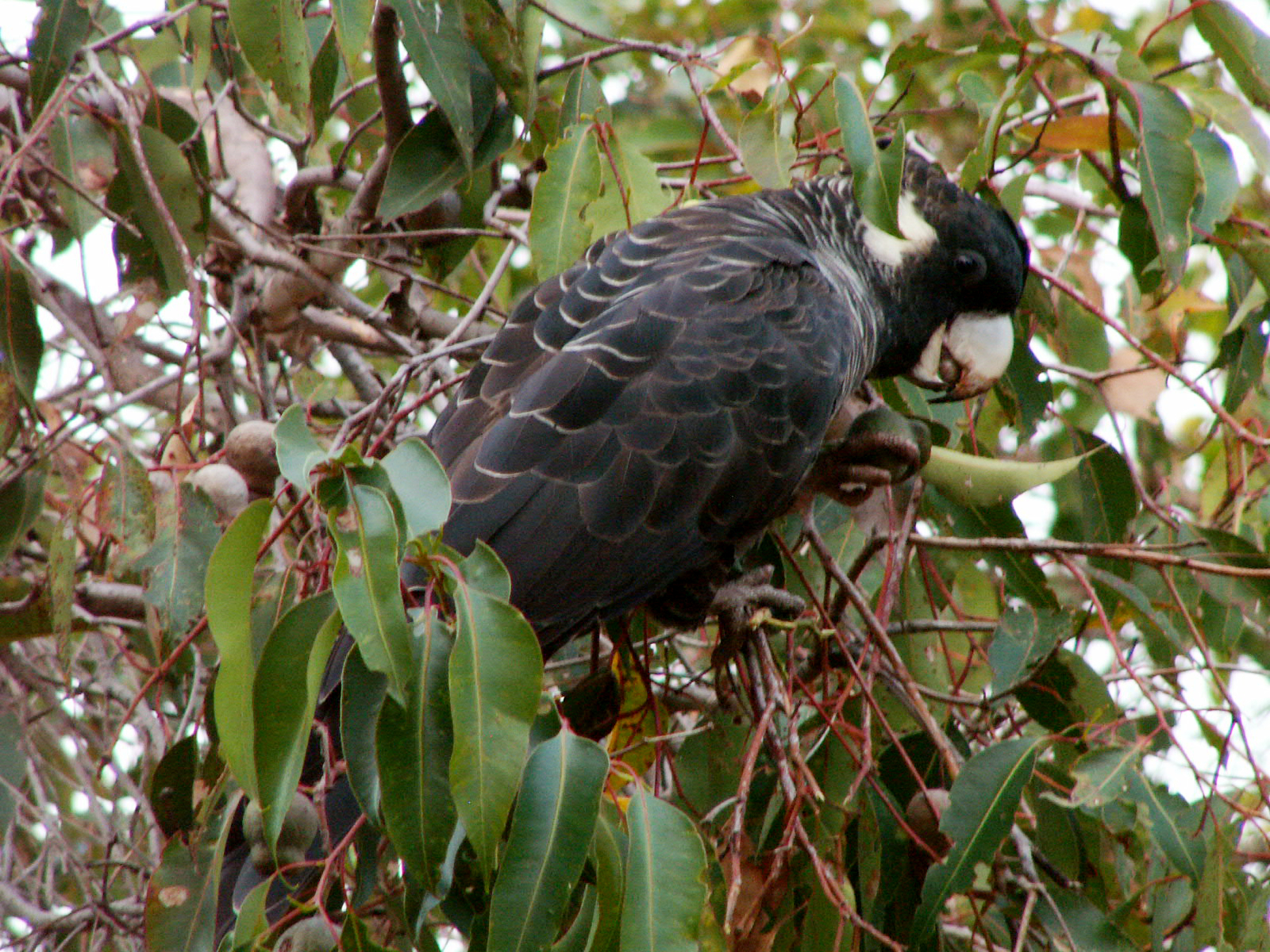
The IBA is important for Baudin's black-cockatoos

Gidgegannup Important Bird Area is a highly fragmented tract of land, where the fragments are patches of remnant native vegetation, bounded by a circle roughly 12 km in diameter. It is in south-western Western Australia about 30 km north-east of Perth and on the edge of the Perth suburban region. The towns of Gidgegannup and Parkerville lie on the periphery. It has been identified by BirdLife International as an Important Bird Area (IBA) because it supports at least 450 Baudin's black-cockatoos, as well as small numbers of Carnaby's black-cockatoos, in roost sites outside the breeding season within foraging range of feeding habitat. The IBA also supports red-capped parrots, rufous treecreepers, western spinebills, western thornbills and western yellow robins.
