= White cockatoo (disambiguation) =

White cockatoo is the common name of the bird species Cacatua alba.

(The) white cockatoo or White Cockatoo may also refer to:

== Birds ==
- Cacatua, the genus of bird to which cacatua alba belongs, many of which are white

== Arts and media ==
- The White Cockatoo, a 1935 American mystery film
- The White Cockatoo (novel), the 1933 novel by Mignon G. Eberhart on which the film was based

== Ethnic groups ==
- White Cockatoo, a kinship group of the Djab Wurrung people of Victoria, Australia
- White Cockatoo, a kinship group of the Girai wurrung people of Victoria, Australia
- White Cockatoo, a kinship group of the Gulidjan people of Victoria, Australia
- White Cockatoo, a kinship group of the Noongar people of the area around Perth in Western Australia
- White Cockatoo, a kinship group of the Wergeia people of Victoria, Australia

== See also ==
- White Cockatoo Performing Group, an Aboriginal Australian performing company
