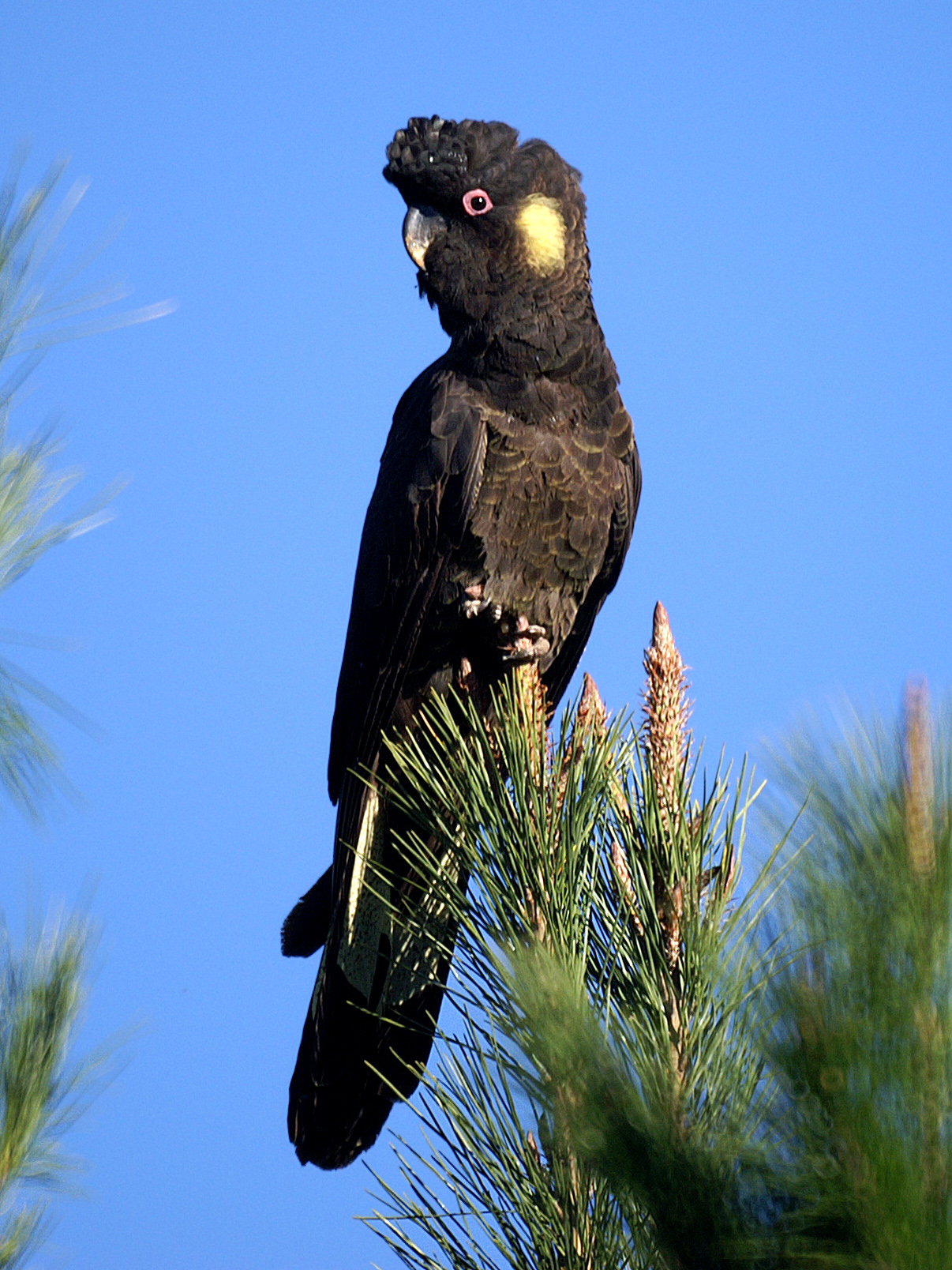
- Yellow-tailed black cockatoo, Zanda funerea

Scientific classification
- Kingdom: Animalia
- Phylum: Chordata
- Class: Aves
- Order: Psittaciformes
- Family: Cacatuidae
- Subfamily: Calyptorhynchinae
- Genus: Zanda; Mathews, 1913

Type species
- Calyptorhynchus baudinii (Baudin's black cockatoo) Lear, 1832

Species
- Zanda funerea Zanda latirostris Zanda baudinii

= Zanda (bird) =

Genus of birds

Zanda is a genus of Australian cockatoos in the subfamily Calyptorhynchinae, containing three species. Members of the genus are mostly black in colour, with short crests. The taxa may be differentiated partly by size and partly by small areas of red, grey, and yellow plumage, especially in the tail feathers.

The genus Zanda was introduced in 1913 by the Australian born ornithologist Gregory Mathews with Baudin's black cockatoo as the type species. Matthews provided no explanation for the etymology but it is possibly an aboriginal name.

== Species ==
The genus contains three species.

Genus Zanda – Mathews, 1913 – two species
Common name	Scientific name and subspecies	Range	Size and ecology	IUCN status and estimated population
Yellow-tailed black cockatoo	Zanda funerea (Shaw, 1794) Two subspecies: Z. f. funerea; Z. f. xanthanota	south-east of Australia	Size: 55-65 cm Habitat: Diet:	LC
Carnaby's black cockatoo	Zanda latirostris (Carnaby, 1948)	southwest Australia	Size: 53-58 cm Habitat: Diet:	EN
Baudin's black cockatoo	Zanda baudinii (Lear, 1832)	southwest Australia	Size: 56 cm Habitat: Diet:	CR
