= Denis A. Saunders =

Australian ornithologist and conservationist

Dr Denis Allan Saunders, AM, (b. 1947) is an Australian ornithologist and conservationist.

== Awards ==
- 1998 – received the Individual in Government Award of the International Society for Conservation Biology
- 1999 – received the IALE Distinguished Scholarship Award of the International Association of Landscape Ecology
- 2005 – made a member of the General Division of the Order of Australia (AM) for "service to nature conservation, particularly through the study of Australian birds and the development of landscape ecology in Australia"
- 2006 – awarded the D.L. Serventy Medal of the Royal Australasian Ornithologists Union (RAOU) for outstanding contributions to publication in the science of ornithology in the Australasian region
