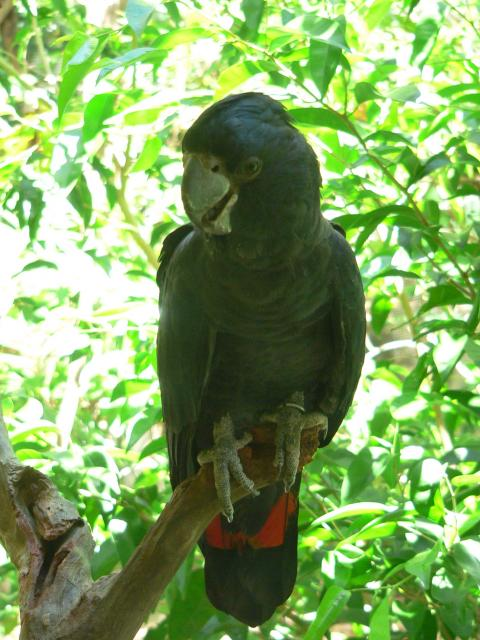
- Calyptorhynchus banksii

Scientific classification
- Kingdom: Animalia
- Phylum: Chordata
- Class: Aves
- Order: Psittaciformes
- Family: Cacatuidae
- Subfamily: Calyptorhynchinae; Bonaparte, 1853
- Genus: Calyptorhynchus; Desmarest, 1826

Type species
- Psittacus banksii Latham, 1790

Species
- Two

= Calyptorhynchus =

Genus of cockatoos

Described by French naturalist Anselme Gaëtan Desmarest in 1826, the genus Calyptorhynchus has two species of cockatoos. They are all mostly black in colour, and the taxa may be differentiated partly by size and partly by small areas of red, grey, and yellow plumage, especially in the tail feathers. Studies based on the mitochondrial DNA 12S gene fragment suggested that other sexually dichromatic species, the gang-gang cockatoo and the cockatiel may be the closest living relatives of Calyptorhynchus. However, subsequent studies, including more genes confirm the morphological taxonomy with the gang-gang cockatoo most closely related to the galah, within the white cockatoo group, and with the cockatiel as a third distinct subfamily of cockatoos.

Genus Calyptorhynchus – Desmarest, 1826 – two species
| Common name | Scientific name and subspecies | Range | Size and ecology | IUCN status and estimated population |
|---|---|---|---|---|
| Red-tailed black cockatoo | Calyptorhynchus banksii (Latham, 1790) Five subspecies: C. b. banksii; C. b. escondidus; C. b. graptogyne; C. b. naso; C. b. samueli | Australia | Size: Habitat: Diet: | LC |
| Glossy black cockatoo | Calyptorhynchus lathami (Temminck, 1807) Three subspecies: C. l. lathami; C. l. erebus; C. l. halmaturinus | eastern Australia. | Size: Habitat: Diet: | VU |

The Yellow-tailed black cockatoo, Baudin's black cockatoo and Carnaby's black cockatoo were previously included in Calyptorhynchus as subgenus Zanda. However, based on genetic divergence Zanda was recognised as a genus and the three species transferred out of Calyptorhynchus.
