= Common heath =

Common heath is a common name for several plants and may refer to:

- Calluna vulgaris, native to Europe
- Epacris impressa, native to Australia

== See also ==
- Ematurga atomaria, a species of moth native to Europe
