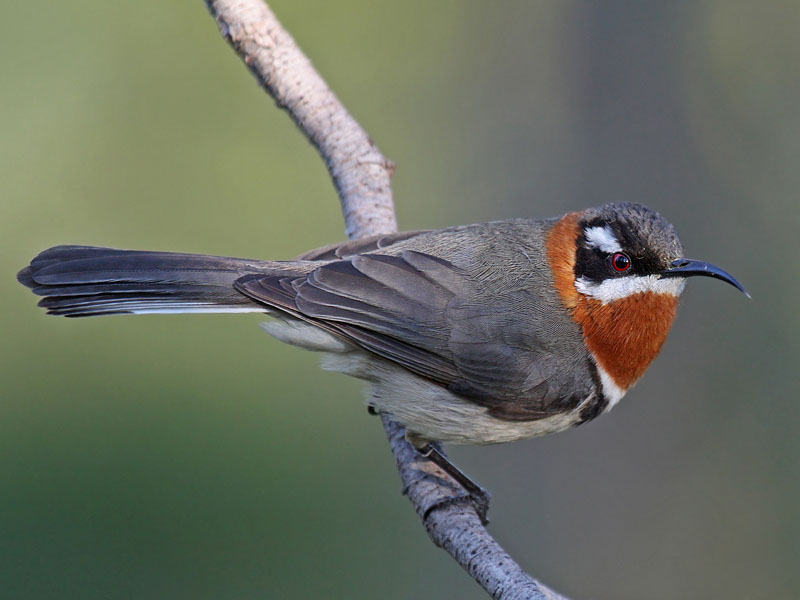
- Male

Conservation status
- Least Concern (IUCN 3.1)

Scientific classification
- Kingdom: Animalia
- Phylum: Chordata
- Class: Aves
- Order: Passeriformes
- Family: Meliphagidae
- Genus: Acanthorhynchus
- Species: A. superciliosus

Binomial name
- Acanthorhynchus superciliosus Gould, 1837

= Western spinebill =

Species of bird

The western spinebill (Acanthorhynchus superciliosus) is a honeyeater found in the heath and woodland of south-western Australia. Ranging between 12–16 centimetres (4.7–6.3 in) long, it weighs around 10 grams (0.35 oz). It has a black head, gray back and wings, with a red band behind its neck and from its throat to its breast. Its curved bill is long and slender.

Like other honeyeaters, the western spinebill feeds on nectar. It tends to obtain its nectar from lower shrubs than most other honeyeaters, including Banksia, Dryandra, Grevillea, Adenanthos, and Verticordia. It also feeds from trees of Banksia and Eucalyptus, and from herbs such as Anigozanthos. In addition to nectar, it feeds on insects that it captures in the air or on plants.

It is a frequent visitor to Adenanthos obovatus, and its territories are smaller when they contain more shrubs of this species. Male spinebills often contest their territory borders with other males, and allow females to live within them. These territories range from 0.2 to 0.5 hectares in size. With their long curved bills, western spinebills are the only honeyeaters able to gain nectar out of the tube-like flowers.

It breeds from September to January, in a nest made from bark, plant stems, down and spider web. It lays 1–2 eggs, usually incubated by the female.

== Systematics ==
First described by John Gould in 1837, the western spinebill is a monotypic species, with only one form found across its range. It forms a superspecies with the closely related eastern spinebill. Scientists believe the two sister species are descended from a shared ancestor whose once widespread populations were separated by climate change. During a past period of desertification, that ancestor species retreated to refuges in the southwestern and southeastern corners of the continent, and evolved into the two present-day spinebill species. Recent DNA studies have shown that the two spinebills belong to a clade which is a sister taxon to all other honeyeaters.

The two are members of the genus Acanthorhynchus, from the Ancient Greek akantha, meaning 'spine' and rhunkhos, meaning 'bill'. The specific name superciliosus is Latin for 'eyebrowed', a reference to the male's bold white supercilium. Early settler George Fletcher Moore reported that the Noongar, southwestern Australia's indigenous people, called this species "buljit".

== Description ==
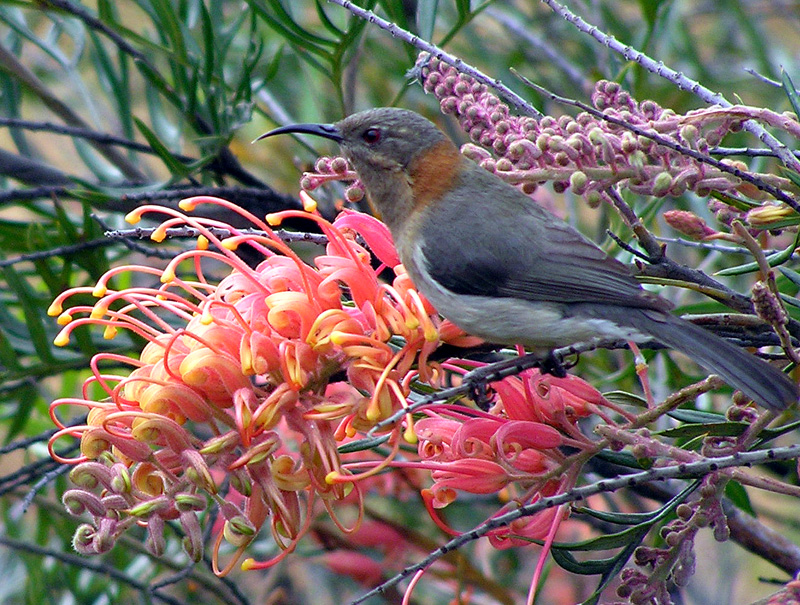
The female is smaller and plainer than the male.

The western spinebill is a small honeyeater with a slender, curved bill. It ranges in length from 12 to 16 cm (4.7 to 6.3 in), (Note: By convention, length is measured from the tip of the bill to the tip of the tail on a dead bird (or skin) laid on its back.) and in weight from 8–11 g (0.28–0.39 oz). Males are, on average, slightly larger than females. The sexes differ somewhat in plumage. The male is dark olive-grey above with a chestnut nape. Below, his throat and breast are chestnut, edged below with a white band and a black band; his abdomen is buff. He has a white eyebrow and a black mask, and white outer tail feathers which are 'flirted' in flight. The female is plainer, with a pale rufous nape. Her throat and underparts are variously described as rufous-buff or pale grey, and she lacks the distinctive banding of the male. The immature resembles a plainer female, though with a yellow base to the bill.

=== Voice ===
The high, shrill, staccato piping of the western spinebill is transcribed as kleet-kleet or kleat-kleat.

== Range and habitat ==
Endemic to the southwestern corner of Western Australia, the western spinebill is found from north of Jurien Bay to Israelite Bay, and inland to an arc described by Moora, Corrigin and Lake Grace. It is common in the understorey of heaths, coastal scrub, woodlands and forest, and in Banksia thickets.

The species is kept in Western Australian aviaries, as the sister species Acanthorhynchus tenuirostris of the east is held in captivity in Sydney, due to the local species being available to avicultural enthusiasts of honeyeaters.

== Behaviour ==
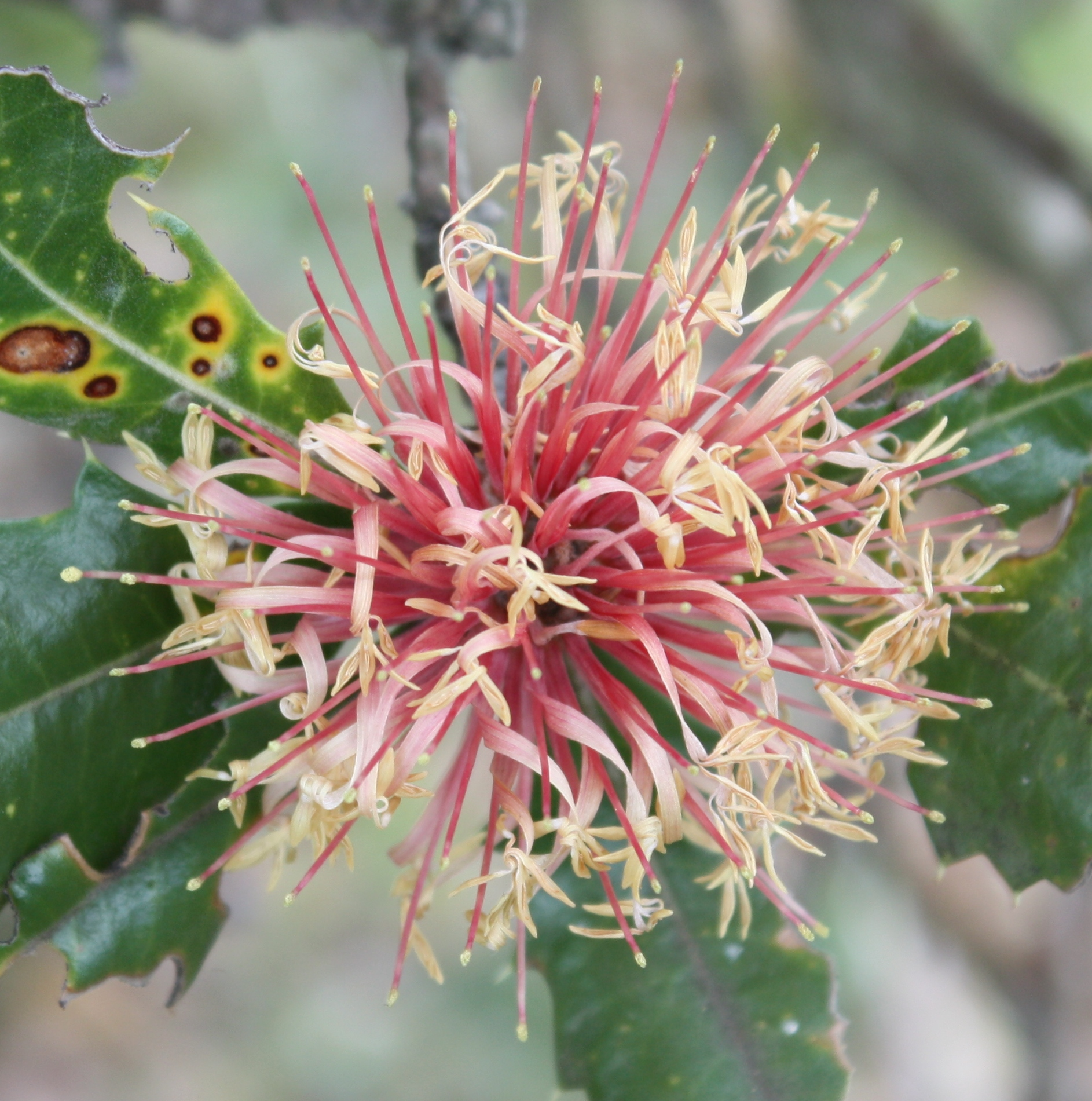
Flowers of Banksia ilicifolia are a favourite nectar source.

The western spinebill is known to be locally nomadic.

=== Feeding ===
Like other honeyeaters, the western spinebill feeds primarily on nectar. It feeds for longer time periods—and ingests more nectar—in the first 60 to 90 minutes of each day than it does later in the day.

Banksia ilicifolia is particularly sought over other banksias, which may be foraged, including B. menziesii (although birds do not congregate in greater numbers when this species is flowering), and B. sessilis. The western spinebill has been observed foraging at flower spikes lower down in the tree canopy, possibly to avoid larger and more aggressive honeyeaters.

=== Breeding ===
The western spinebill breeds primarily from September to January, though eggs have been noted as early as August, and fledglings as late as March. The female, only very occasionally with help from the male, builds a tidy cup nest from bark, grass, plant stems, and plant down, bound with spider webs to a low bush or tree. The nest, which is sometimes conspicuous, is typically located 1–5 m (3.3–16.4 ft) off the ground. The female lays 1–2 eggs, which measure 17 mm × 13 mm (0.67 in × 0.51 in) on average. These are pinkish or bluish with spots and blotches of chestnut or purplish-brown. The eggs are incubated primarily by the female, only very occasionally by the male. Nestlings are fed by both parents, and fledge after 15 days or so. Both parents continue to feed the fledglings for some time after they leave the nest. The species is one of many known to host the offspring of the pallid cuckoo, a brood parasite.
