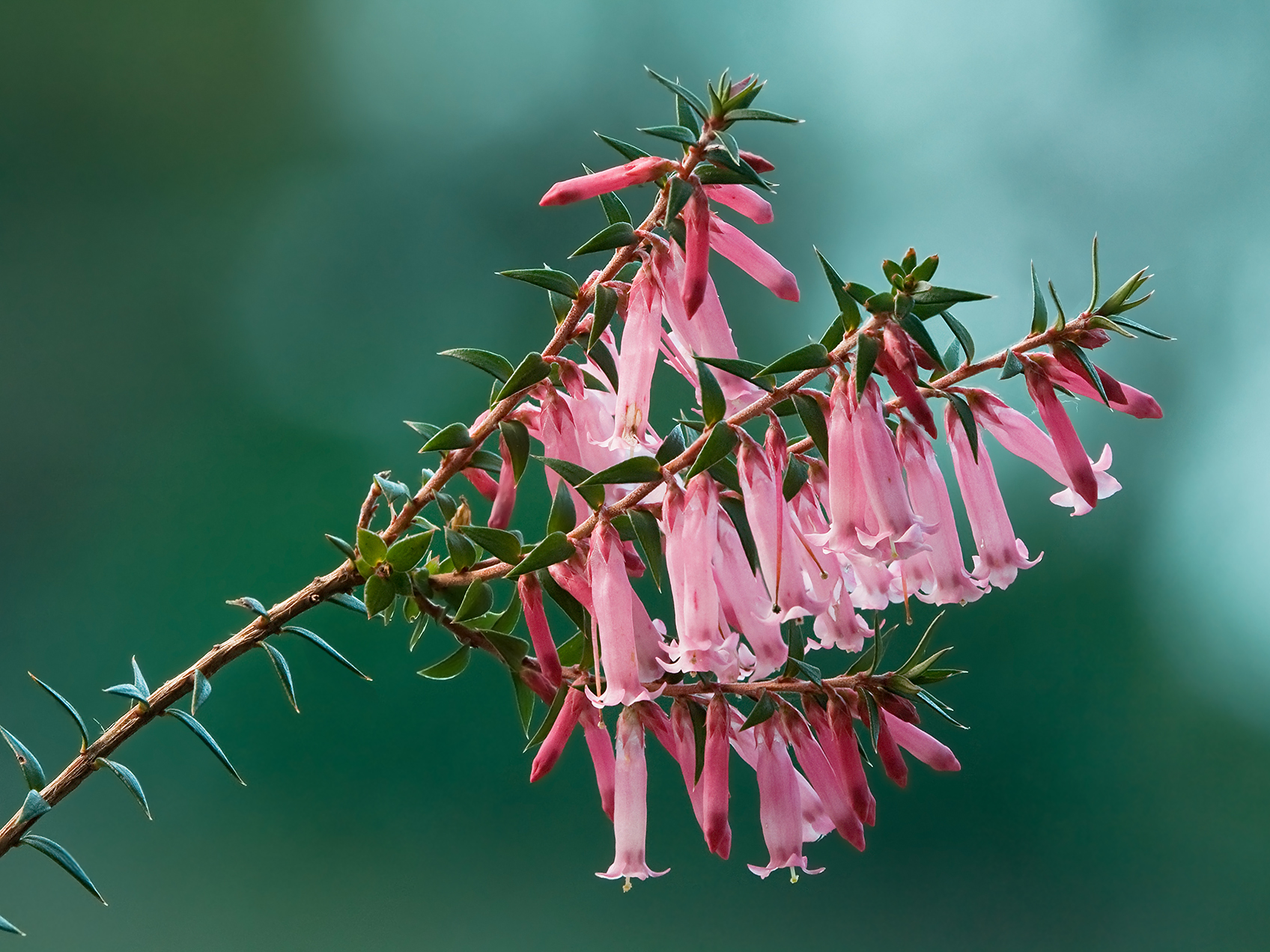

Scientific classification
- Kingdom: Plantae
- Clade: Tracheophytes
- Clade: Angiosperms
- Clade: Eudicots
- Clade: Asterids
- Order: Ericales
- Family: Ericaceae
- Genus: Epacris
- Species: E. impressa

Binomial name
- Epacris impressa Labill.
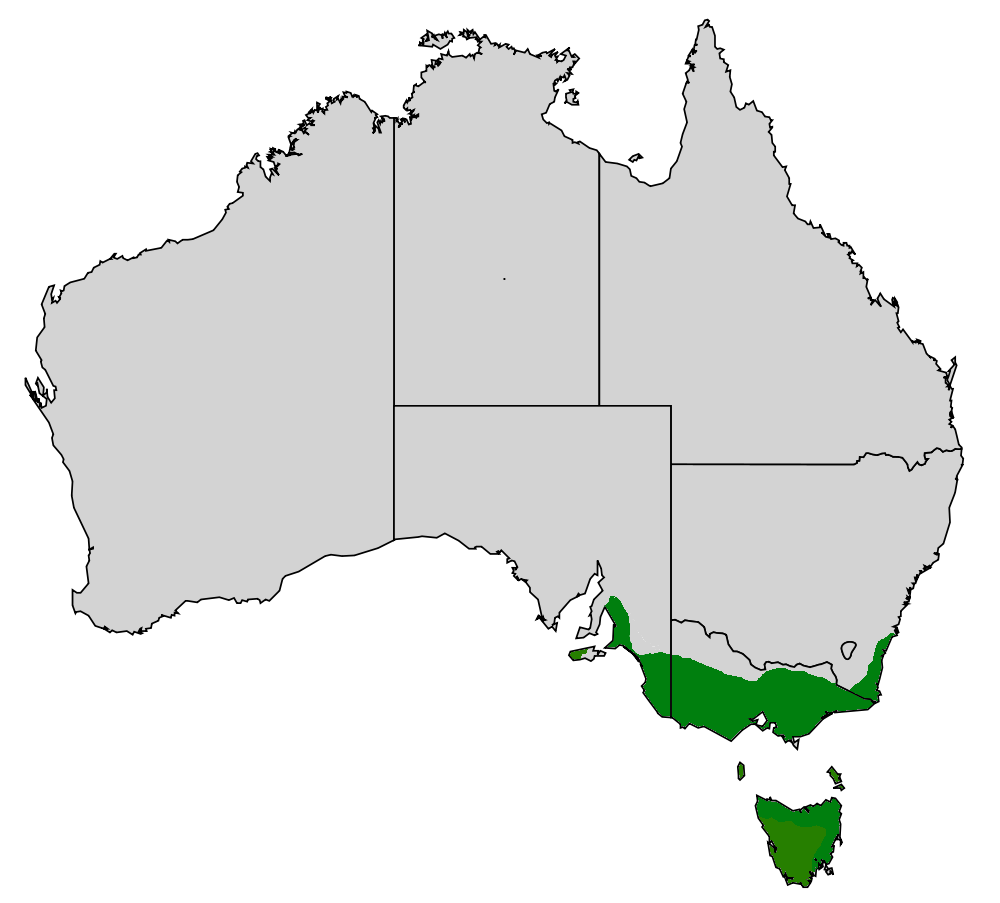

Synonyms
- List: Epacris campanulata G.Lodd. ex Drapiez; Epacris campanulata Lodd., G.Lodd. & W.Lodd. nom. inval., nom. nud.; Epacris campanulata DC. nom. illeg.; Epacris campanulata G.Lodd. ex Drapiez var. campanulata; Epacris ceraeflora Graham orth. var.; Epacris ceriflora Graham; Epacris impressa f. ceraeflora Siebert & Voss orth. var.; Epacris impressa f. ceriflora (Graham) Siebert & Voss; Epacris impressa f. grandiflora (Benth.) Siebert & Voss; Epacris impressa Labill. f. impressa; Epacris impressa f. nivalis Siebert & Voss; Epacris impressa f. ruscifolia (R.Br.) Siebert & Voss; Epacris impressa var. campanulata (DC.) Hook.f.; Epacris impressa var. ceraeflora Rodway orth. var.; Epacris impressa var. ceriflora (Graham) Rodway; Epacris impressa var. grandiflora Benth.; Epacris impressa Labill. var. impressa; Epacris impressa var. nivea (DC.) Hook.f.; Epacris impressa var. ovata Benth.; Epacris impressa var. ruscifolia Meredith nom. inval., nom. nud.; Epacris impressa var. ruscifolia (R.Br.) Rodway; Epacris nivalis G.Lodd. ex Lindl.; Epacris nivalis Lodd., G.Lodd. & W.Lodd. nom. inval., nom. nud.; Epacris nivalis Graham nom. illeg.; Epacris nivea DC nom. illeg., nom. superfl.; Epacris ruscifolia R.Br.; Epacris tomentosa Lindl.; Epacris variabilis Lodd., G.Lodd. & W.Lodd. ex Courtois; Epacris variabilis Lodd., G.Lodd. & W.Lodd.

= Epacris impressa =

Common heath

Species of plant

Epacris impressa, also known as common heath, is a species of plant in the heath family Ericaceae. It is native to south-eastern Australia (the states of Victoria, Tasmania, South Australia and New South Wales). French botanist Jacques Labillardière collected the species in 1793 and described it in 1805. Four forms have been identified, but no subspecies are recognised. Growing in heathland, shrubland or open forest, it is generally a small shrub around 0.5 to 1 m (1 ft 8 in to 3 ft 3 in) tall, with small stiff leaves. The red, pink or white tube-like flowers appear from late autumn to early spring. Honeyeater birds, particularly the eastern spinebill, feed upon the nectar of the flowers. It regenerates after bushfire by seed or by resprouting.

A highly regarded garden plant, the common heath was first cultivated in England in 1825; over seventy named cultivars have been developed, most of which have now vanished. A pink-flowered form, often referred to as "pink heath", is the floral emblem of the state of Victoria. Epacris impressa has proven a difficult plant to propagate reliably, which has limited its use in horticulture and revegetation. It grows best in well-drained but moist soil in a semishaded position.

== Description ==
Epacris impressa grows as a woody shrub with an erect habit, sometimes reaching 2 to 3 m (6 ft 7 in to 9 ft 10 in) in height although plants in the range of 0.5 to 1 m (1 ft 8 in to 3 ft 3 in) tall are more commonly observed. The branches are stiff and have small leaves with prickly, pointed apices that are 8–16 mm (3/8–5/8 in) long. The flowers mainly occur between late autumn and early spring, arising in dense and sometimes pendulous clusters along the stems. White, pink or red in colour, they are 1–2 cm (3/8–3/4 in) and are narrow and tubular with five indentations on the base. The corolla of the flower is formed by five petals, fused at the base to form a tubelike structure, with the free petal ends forming five lobes at the apex. There are five whorled sepals at the base of the corolla. Within the corolla is a central style that persists through development of the fruit. The style connects the stigma at the apex and ovary at the base, where the nectar is also located. Different colour forms are often observed growing near each other. The fruit is a 5-locule capsule that is about 3.5 mm (1/8 in) in diameter. It is globular in shape, sometimes with one end flattened. Initially green, it dries and splits, releasing numerous tiny seeds.

== Taxonomy ==
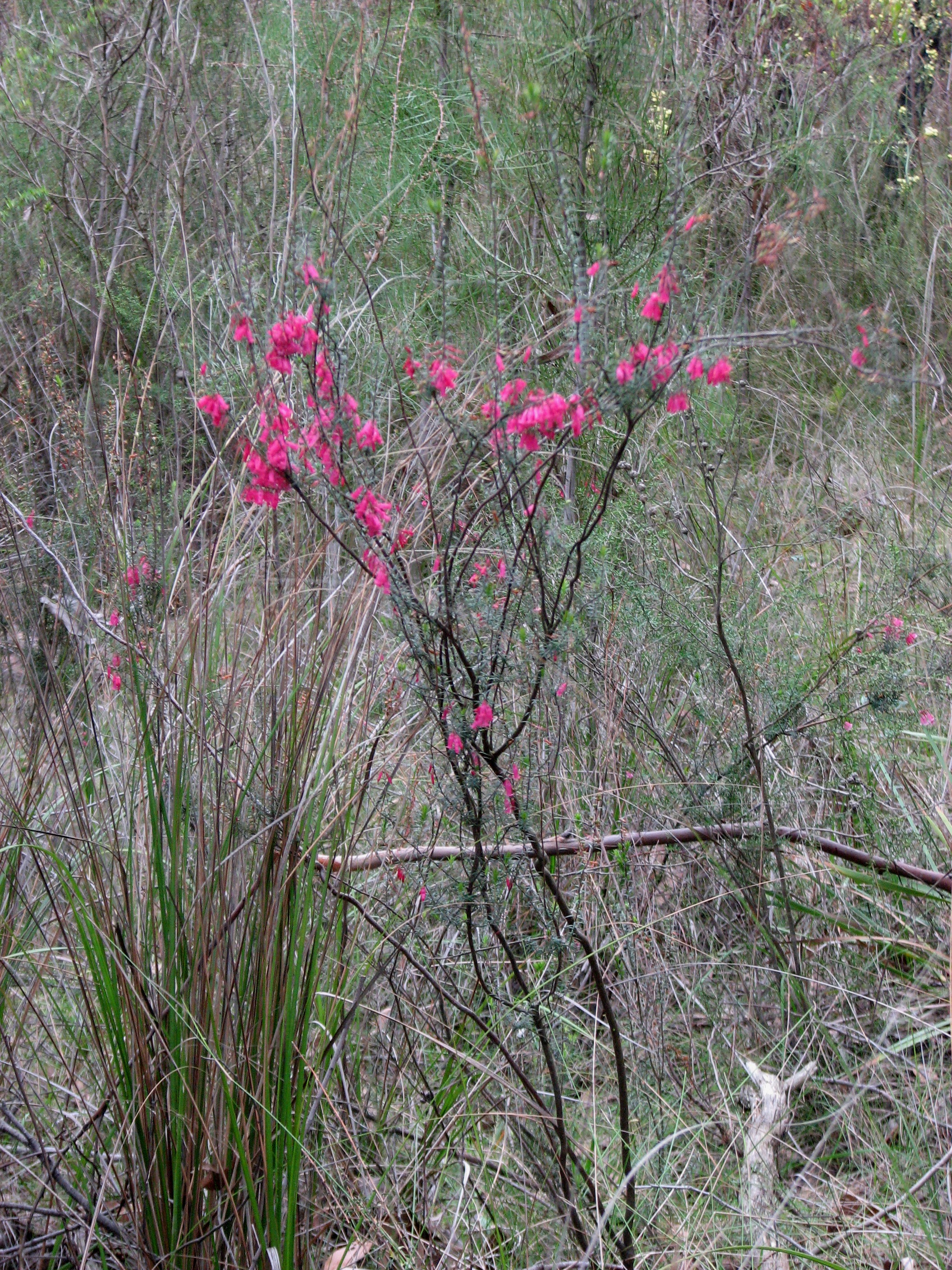
Erect habit, Belgrave South, Victoria

The type specimen of common heath was collected in 1793 by French botanist Jacques Labillardière in Van Diemen's Land (now Tasmania) during a voyage with Antoine Bruni d'Entrecasteaux. Labillardière described it in his 1805 work Novae Hollandiae Plantarum Specimen, giving it its current name Epacris impressa. The Latin specific epithet impressa (meaning "impressed" or "indented") alludes to the indentations on the floral tube. The original mounted specimen is currently held at the National Herbarium of Victoria at the Royal Botanic Gardens, Melbourne.

A number of specimens once described as separate species are now regarded as Epacris impressa, with no recognised subspecies. Scottish botanist Robert Brown described Epacris ruscifolia in his 1810 work Prodromus Florae Novae Hollandiae et Insulae Van Diemen alongside E. impressa. John Lindley described Epacris tomentosa from plant specimens collected during the third expedition of Thomas Mitchell in 1838. Upon encountering Epacris impressa on Mount William in the Grampians, Mitchell remarked that it was "A most beautiful downy-leaved Epacris with large, curved, purple flowers, allied to E. grandiflora (Note: Mitchell here makes a comparison to Epacris grandiflora Willd., a synonym of Epacris longiflora, not to be confused with Epacris impressa var. grandiflora Benth.) but much handsomer". Dr Robert Graham described Epacris ceriflora (which he spelt ceraeflora) from plants cultivated at the Edinburgh Botanic Gardens in 1832. The seed had come from Tasmania, the resulting progeny flowering over April and May 1832. A year later, he described E. nivalis, which he called an "exceedingly beautiful species", from specimens growing in Loddiges nursery. He also noted a form with long corollas that had been called E. variabilis that was in cultivation at the time, and noted it was difficult to describe the precise characteristics that distinguished E. ceraeflora, E. nivalis, E. variabilis and E. impressa.

In his landmark Flora Australiensis (1869), George Bentham argued that several previously described species were in fact a single species – E. impressa, uniting E. variabilis, a short red-flowered E. campanulata, E. ruscifolia, which had narrow leaves and long flowers, the white-flowered E. nivalis, and short white-flowered E. ceraeflora. He re-classified as a separate species – E. reclinata – several plants that Allan Cunningham had collected in the Blue Mountains and classified as E. impressa.

In the same work, Bentham named and described two naturally occurring varieties, Epacris impressa var. grandiflora and E. impressa var. ovata. Plant specimens designated as grandiflora had been collected in the Wimmera, the Grampians (including those previously designated as E. tomentosa) and at Stawell in Victoria. Those classified as ovata were collected at Twofold Bay and Mount Imlay in southeastern New South Wales as well as Woolnorth and Rocky Cape in northern Tasmania. Bentham noted that, although variable, all forms had "five impressed cavities outside, alternating with the stamens immediately above the ovary."

In his 1972 publication A Handbook to Plants in Victoria, Australian botanist Jim Willis expressed his view that dividing the species into subspecies was not feasible given that common heath is highly variable in flower colour and leaf shape, though he conceded the Grampians race grandiflora might be distinctive based on its larger corollas and coarser and hairier foliage. Currently, both grandiflora and ovata are regarded as synonyms of Epacris impressa rather than being classified as distinct varieties. The plant populations that best fit Bentham's original description of grandiflora, also known as Grampians heath, occur naturally on sandstone at locations including Mount Zero, Mount Stapylton and the Black Range. Other nearby populations are regarded as having intermediate characteristics, including those in the Victoria Range and Mount Arapiles. Although not recognised in the Australian Plant Census, the variety is noted as "rare" on the list of Advisory List of Rare or Threatened Plants in Victoria issued by the Department of Environment and Primary Industries.

=== Variation in flower colour and length ===
Forms of E. impressa

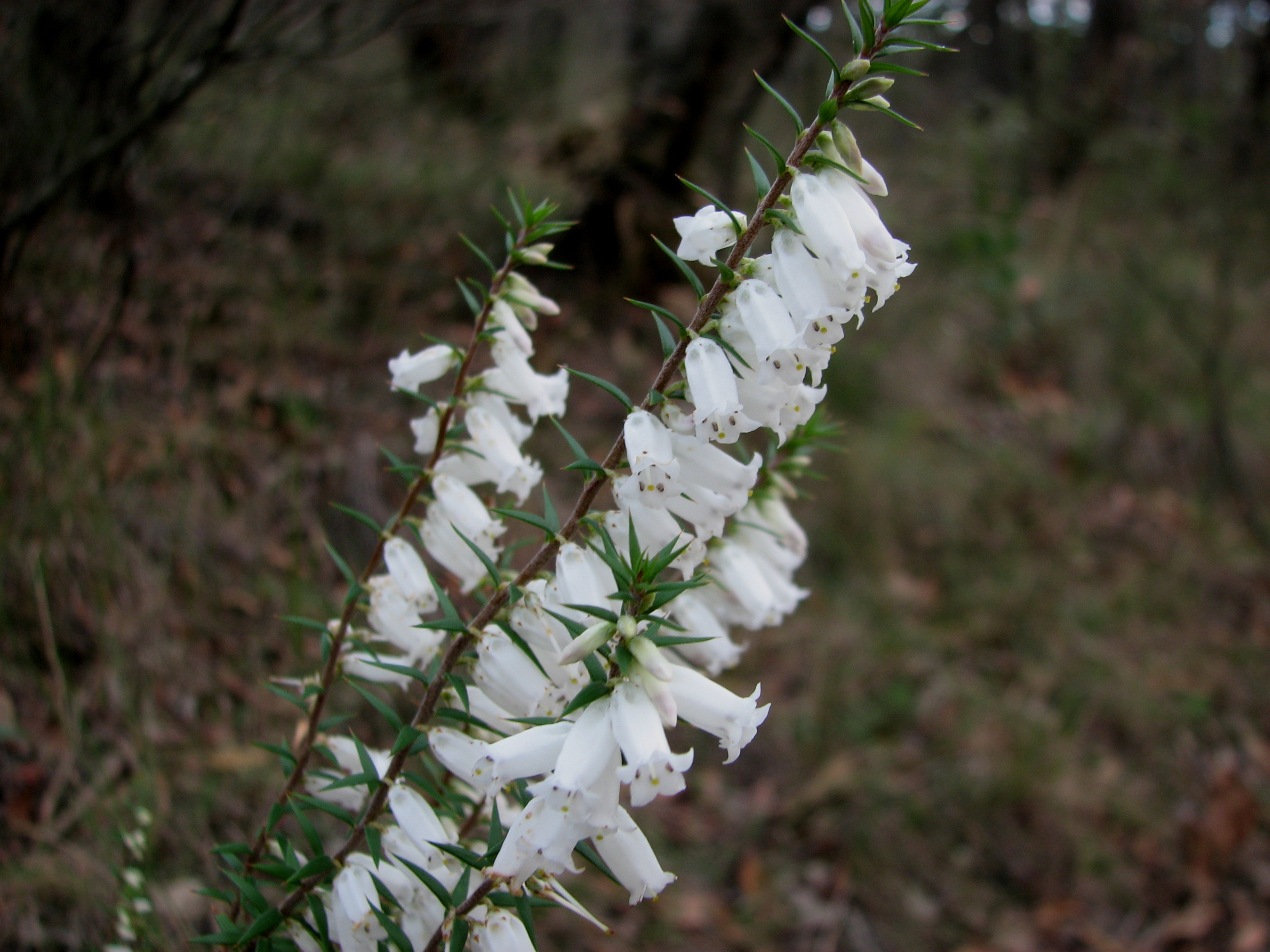
White-flowering form, southern Victoria

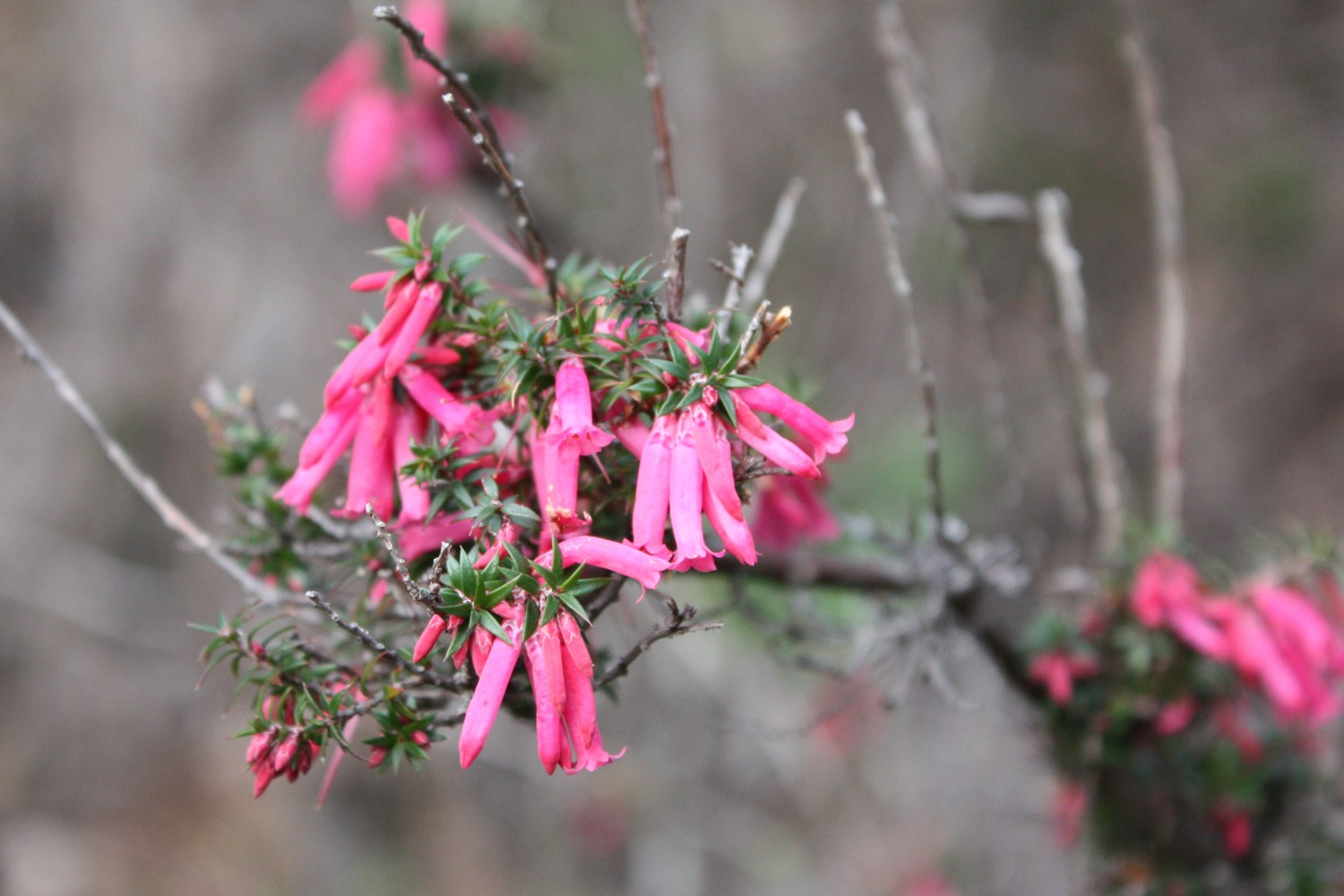
Pink-flowering form, Tasmania

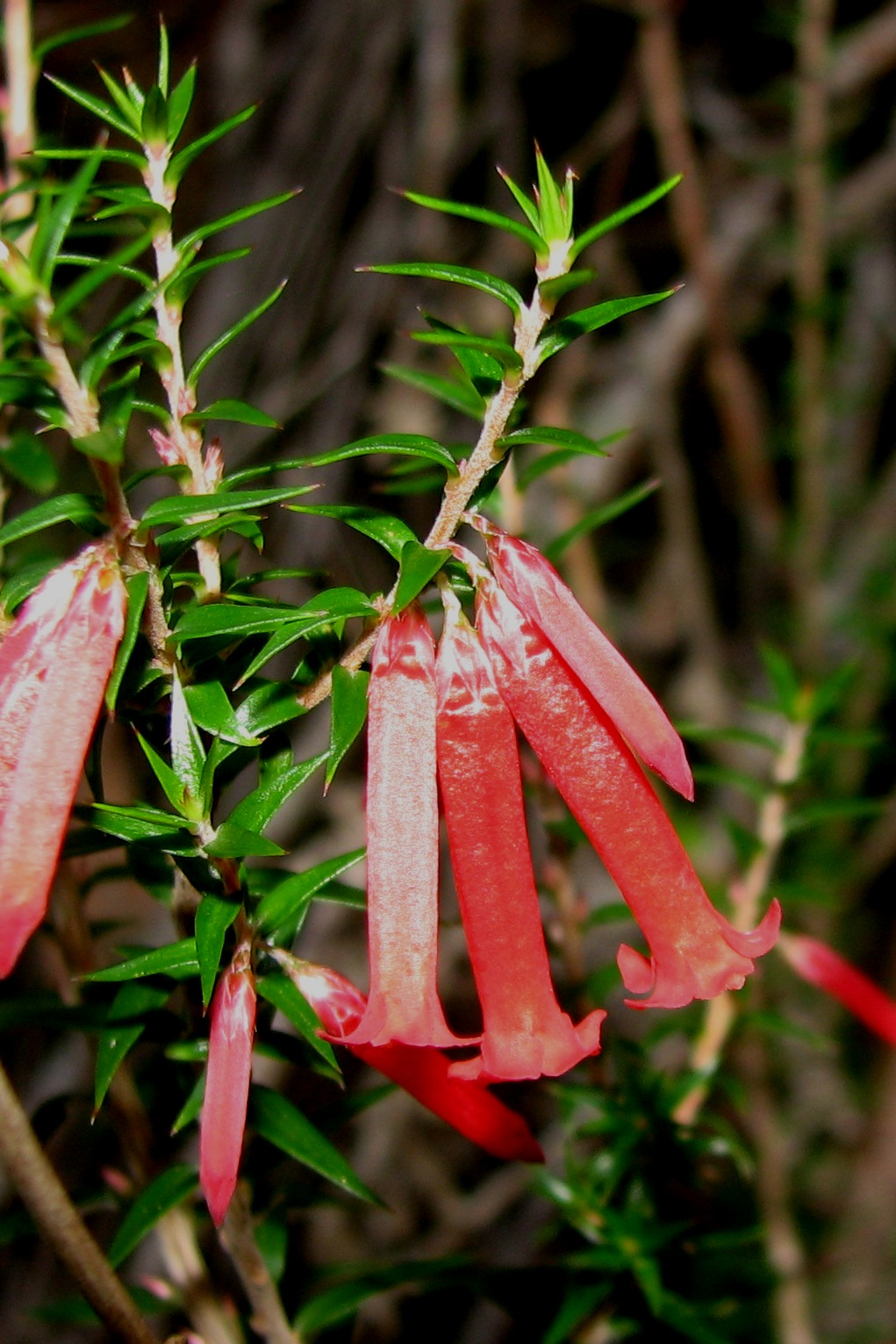
Scarlet-flowering form, Wilsons Promontory

In 1977 Helen Stace and Yvonne Fripp from La Trobe University studied 195 populations of Epacris impressa in Victoria, South Australia and Tasmania and found that 120 consisted of mixed stands of two or more races while 75 populations were of one race only. They identified four races based on the following corolla characteristics:

- white-flowered with a markedly shortened corolla that is 9–12 mm (3/8–1/2 in) long and red-purple anthers, usually found in sites with greater sun exposure. Occurring throughout the species range, this form is the most widely distributed.
- pink-flowered, with a longer corolla that is 12–19 mm (1/2–3/4 in) long and cream-white anthers, in more shaded sites. This form occurs throughout the species range. Field work in Victoria and Tasmania found that pink-flowered plants in mixed populations often have pink or red anthers.
- long scarlet race, with orange-red flowers and corolla 15–19 mm (5/8–3/4 in) long and cream-white anthers. Those from the granitic mountains of Wilsons Promontory and near W Tree in East Gippsland in Victoria flower between April and November. Other localities where this race has been recorded include the Howe Ranges and Clyde Mountain in New South Wales.
- broad pink or white, the grandiflora race from the Grampians and Mount Arapiles in Victoria. Plants of this race are taller, often reaching 2 metres (6 ft 7 in) in height. White or pink colour bear no relation to corolla length. Plants from Mount Arapiles are always pink-flowered.

The long-pink and short-white races frequently occur in close proximity to each other; in these mixed populations the former tends to flower in winter and the latter in spring. The question has been raised whether these different forms are becoming incompatible. However, controlled cross-pollination between plants with short and long corollas showed that there was no incompatibility between them.

Pink-flowering populations have a relatively distinct genetic makeup, whereas red or white flowering populations have more evident sharing of genetic traits. Research based on DNA profiling has revealed substantial genetic diversity within and between flower colour races and site populations. This has implications for vegetation projects in that provenance material needs to be collected from a wide geographic area to maintain this diversity.

== Distribution ==
Epacris impressa is commonly found in coastal regions and nearby foothills, ranging from Kangaroo Island and the southern Mount Lofty Ranges in South Australia across southern Victoria, extending to the Grampians and the Little Desert, and northwards to southern New South Wales as far as the Clyde River in the Budawang Range. It is also widespread in Tasmania. Plants are recorded at altitudes up to 1,200 metres (3,900 ft) at Mount Stradbroke and Mount Tingaringy in East Gippsland. The species grows in widely diverse habitats including sand and clay heathland, herb-rich and heathy woodland, lowland and shrubby dry forests, riparian thickets, montane rocky shrubland and rocky outcrops.

== Ecology ==
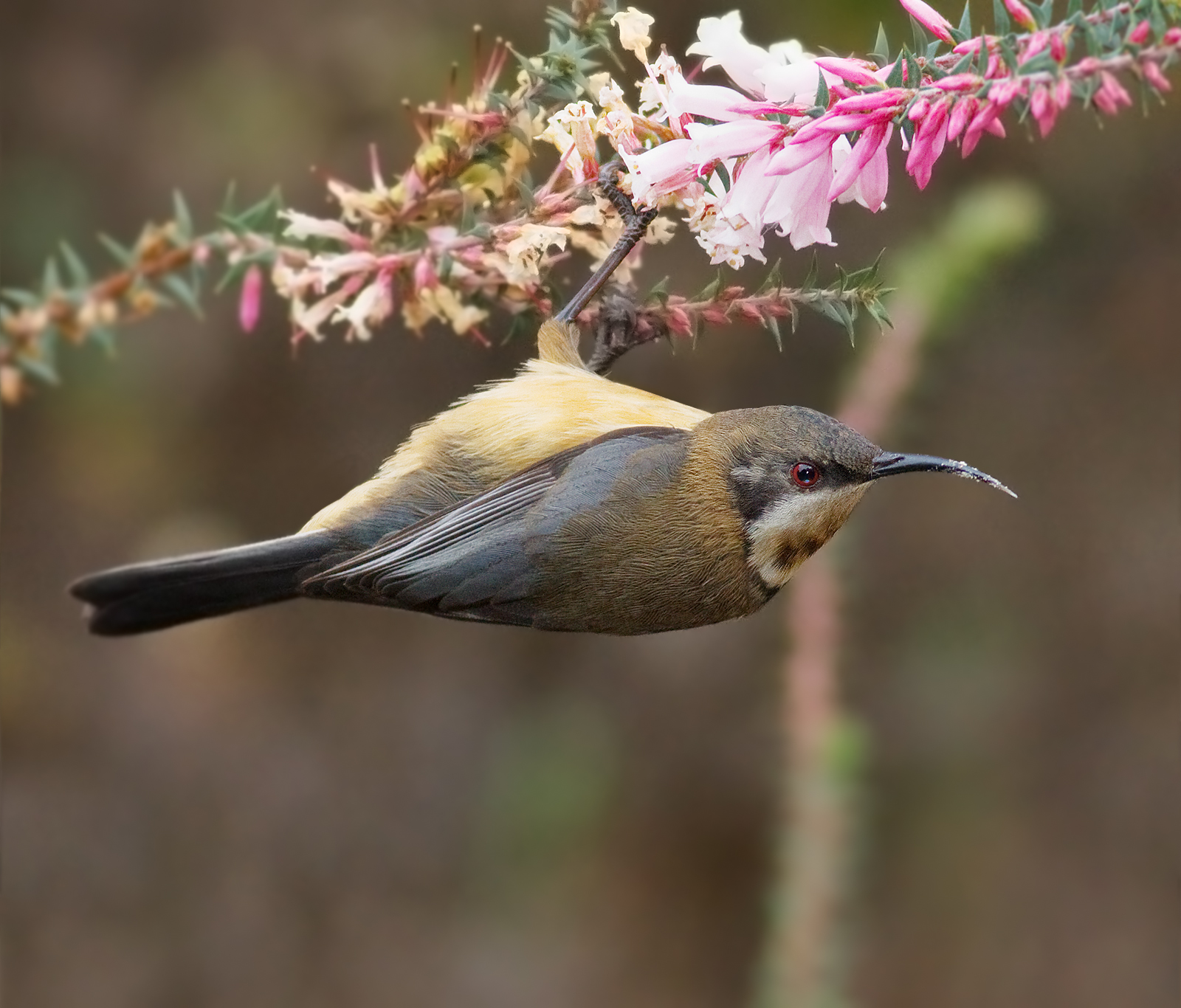
Eastern spinebill on Epacris impressa, Royal Tasmanian Botanical Gardens

Honeyeaters such as the eastern spinebill are attracted to the flowers. As the bird gathers the nectar, the pollen, which has fins, attaches itself to the feathers on the heads of the birds and is carried to other flowers, aiding cross pollination. A study in forests near Hobart in Tasmania found that the eastern spinebill arrived in the area at the same time the common heath was in flower in March, and left once flowering had finished. Other honeyeaters, such as the strong-billed, crescent and yellow-throated honeyeaters, fed occasionally at common heath flowers. Field work in the Mount Lofty Ranges in South Australia recorded the white-plumed and New Holland honeyeaters, as well as the crescent honeyeater and the eastern spinebill.

Insects recorded visiting white-flowered plants include the Australian painted lady (Vanessa kershawi) and yellow admiral (V. itea), as well as bees. Field work in southern Tasmania showed that the introduced bumblebee (Bombus terrestris) sometimes robbed nectar by piercing the base of the tube. This then allowed honeybees (Apis mellifera) to retrieve nectar the same way. Epacris impressa is host to the scale insect Lecanodiaspis microcribraria.

A field study of the invasion of the pathogen Phytophthora cinnamomi into the Brisbane Ranges National Park in Victoria in 1971 indicated that Epacris impressa was moderately susceptible to the pathogen. Inoculation of seedlings confirmed this. Fieldwork in the Brisbane Ranges National Park in 1985 showed that there was some evidence that E. impressa seedlings were able to recolonise areas that had been infested with P. cinnamomi a decade before.

Epacris impressa regenerates after bushfire by seed and resprouting. Fieldwork in heathland in the Otway Ranges in the years following the 1983 Ash Wednesday bushfires showed that large numbers of E. impressa seedlings appeared in some areas, and that flowering took place as early as the second year after the fire.

The roots of Epacris impressa are colonized by fungi forming ericoid mycorrhiza. It is believed that the fungal species vary between regions.

== Cultivation ==
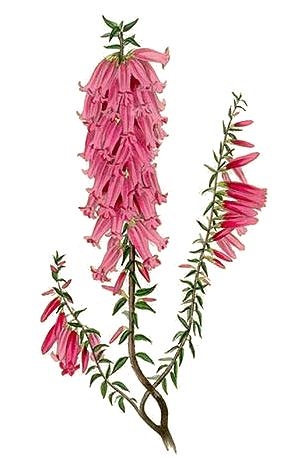
An illustration from Paxton's Magazine of Botany, published in 1836

Propagated from seed collected by William Baxter in southern Australia, common heath was introduced into cultivation in England by the Clapton Nursery in 1825. Due to its frost-tenderness, it was mostly restricted to greenhouse cultivation. In 1873, a variety known as Epacris impressa alba was recorded as being grown commercially for cut flowers in Boston in the United States. While initially popular – over seventy cultivars appeared in the literature at the time – most have since disappeared.

Plants grow best in a moist but well-drained, acidic soil, with added peat being helpful. They may be grown in coastal gardens in a sheltered position, and generally require some degree of shade. Once established, plants can tolerate short dry spells. As they age, plants may become straggly, but benefit from hard pruning after fertilizing and watering, which promotes compact, bushier growth. Common heath can be short-lived and difficult to transplant, though it can be readily grown as a pot plant. Along with other members of the genus, Epacris impressa initially proved difficult to grow and maintain on original soil in the Australian National Botanic Gardens in Canberra.

Propagation both by seed and cuttings is difficult, reducing potential production by plant nurseries. Germination rates of soil-stored seeds have been found to increase substantially with the application of heat and aqueous solutions of smoke. The most satisfactory results from cuttings can be achieved by using tip growth, taken six weeks after the cessation of flowering, and kept under a fogging system for twenty weeks. Plantsman Neil Marriott recommends semi-hardened cutting material taken in spring and autumn. Roots of cuttings are brittle and easily damaged.

=== Cultivars ===
The following forms have been selected and grown for cultivation:

'Bega'

This is a form from Bega in southern New South Wales that has bright red flowers and grows to 60 cm (2.0 ft) high. It is regarded as one of the more reliable forms in cultivation. White- and pink-flowered forms from the same region also have horticultural potential.

'Cranbourne Bells' and other double-flowered forms

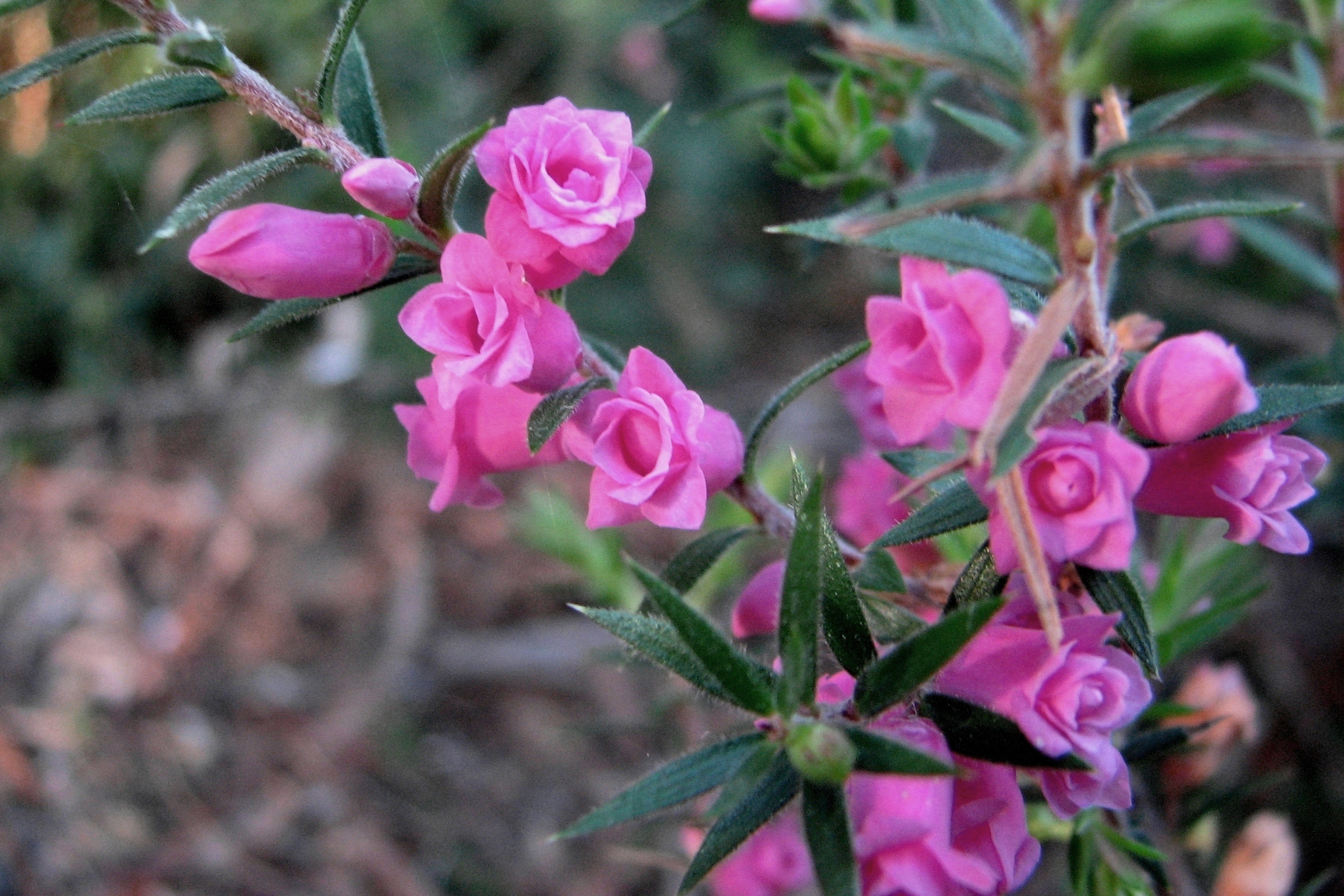
Double-flowered pink form

'Cranbourne Bells' is a double-flowered form with pink flower buds fading to white as they open. Registered by the Australian Cultivar Registration Authority in 1988, it occurred naturally near the Royal Botanic Gardens Cranbourne in Victoria, but its habitat has since been cleared. A double-flowered form of Epacris impressa was collected as early as the 1860s in Victoria when Government Botanist Ferdinand von Mueller sent a specimen to Kew Gardens. This was examined by botanist William Hemsley in 1865. The specimen, labelled as Epacris impressa var. pleniflora, originated from Stawell in western Victoria. Another specimen given the same name by Mueller was collected at Nunawading, today a suburb of Melbourne. Charles French, co-founder of the Field Naturalists Club of Victoria, collected a white double-flowered form from Cheltenham south of Melbourne in 1859 and a pink double-flowered form from Dromana on the Mornington Peninsula in about 1862. These were later sent as rooted cuttings to Veitch Nurseries in England. Double-flowered forms of various colours have since been found throughout Victoria, but only single plants have been observed in any location, and they are still regarded as a rarity. A naturally occurring form of the variety grandiflora with rosebud-like double flowers is also grown.

'Spring Pink'

A form with deep pink flowers on long spikes, 'Spring Pink' appears in spring. It grows to 60 cm (2.0 ft) high.

== Floral emblem of Victoria ==
In 1951, at a meeting of representatives of government and other bodies, it was agreed that the pink form of the common heath, the "pink heath", be adopted as the official floral emblem for the state of Victoria. Victoria was the first Australian state to adopt a floral emblem. The proclamation, made on 11 November 1958 by the Governor, Dallas Brooks, was as follows:

I, the Governor of the State of Victoria, in the Commonwealth of Australia, by and with the advice of the Executive Council of the said State, do by this my Proclamation declare that the Pink Form of the Common Heath, Epacris impressa Labill., be adopted as the Floral Emblem for the State of Victoria"

An Australian stamp series of state floral emblems was issued in 1968. The pink heath was featured on the 13 cent stamp. In 2014, a 70-cent stamp labelled as "Common Heath" was issued. The pink heath is also depicted on the Victorian driver's licence. In 1973, a depiction of pink heath was added to the armorial bearings for Victoria.

== See also ==
- Erica – African–European heath spp.
