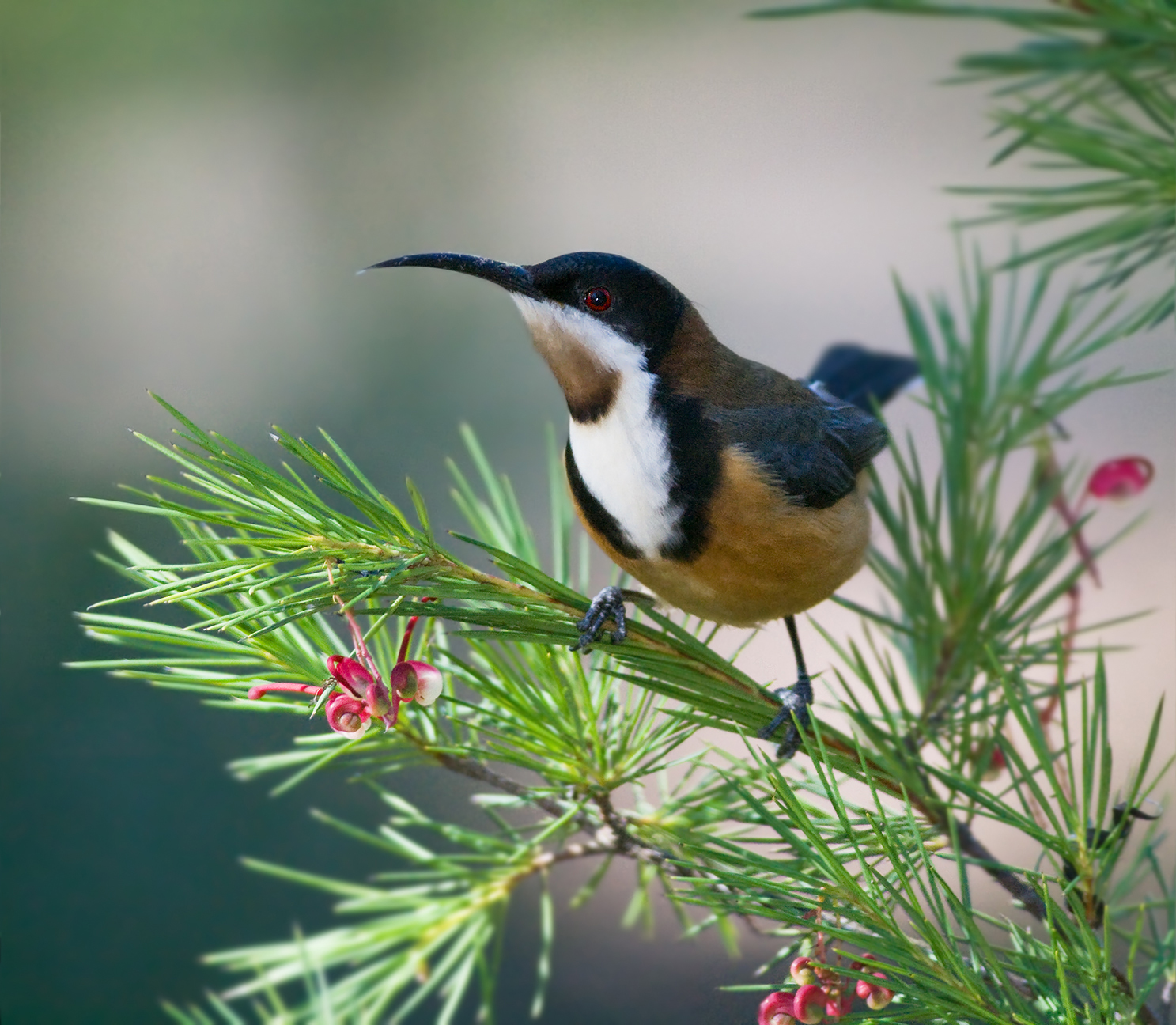
- Eastern spinebill (Acanthorhynchus tenuirostris)

Scientific classification
- Kingdom: Animalia
- Phylum: Chordata
- Class: Aves
- Order: Passeriformes
- Family: Meliphagidae
- Genus: Acanthorhynchus; Gould, 1837

Type species
- Certhia tenuirostris Latham, 1801

Species
- Acanthorhynchus superciliosus Acanthorhynchus tenuirostris

= Spinebill =

Genus of birds

Spinebill is the name given to two members of the honeyeater family, both in the genus Acanthorhynchus, which is Latin for "spine bill". They are around 15 centimetres in length, and are coloured black, white and chestnut, with a long, downcurved bill. They are native to Australia, with one species in the east and one in the west. They feed on nectar as well as insects, and live mainly in forests, gardens, and other shrubbery habitats.

A 2004 molecular study has shown that the two spinebills are a sister grouping to all other honeyeaters, that is, they diverged earlier than all other species.

== Species and distribution ==
The genus contains two species.

Genus Acanthorhynchus – Gould, 1837 – two species
Common name	Scientific name and subspecies	Range	Size and ecology	IUCN status and estimated population
Western spinebill Male Female	Acanthorhynchus superciliosus Gould, 1837	south-western Australia	Size: Habitat: Diet:	LC
Eastern spinebill Male Female	Acanthorhynchus tenuirostris (Latham, 1801)	North Queensland south through New South Wales, eastern South Australia as well as throughout Tasmania	Size: Habitat: Diet:	LC
