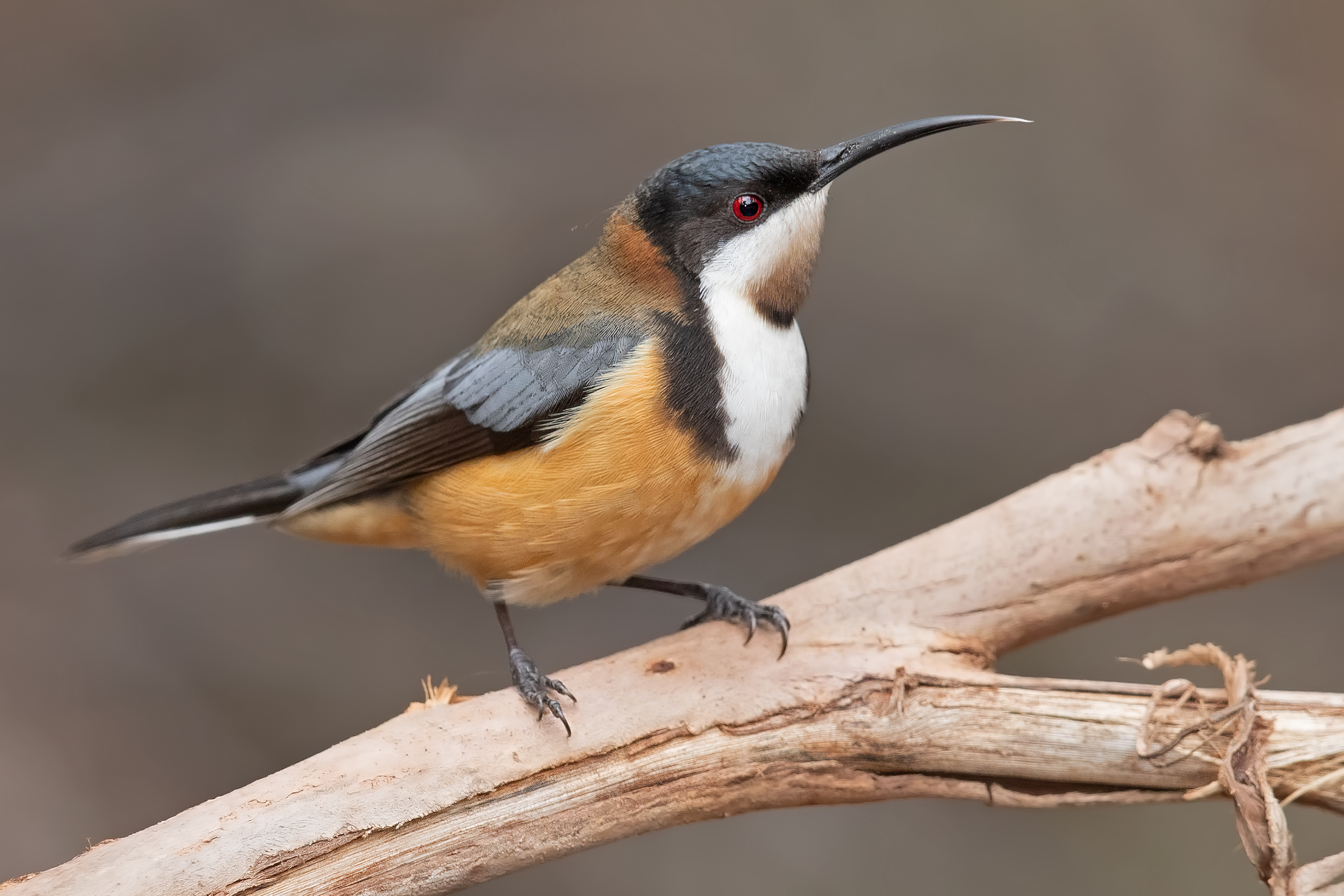
- Male
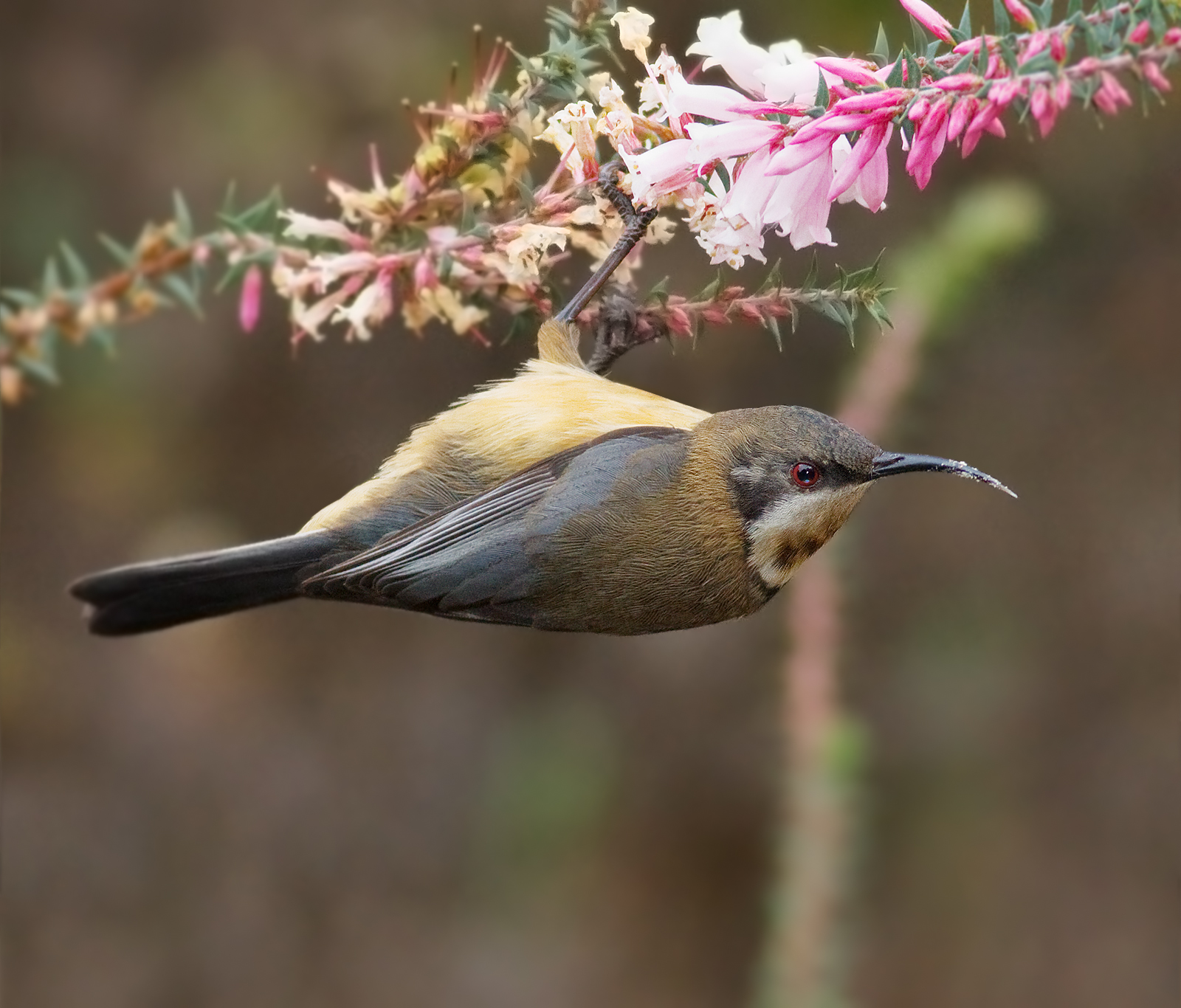
- Female

Conservation status
- Least Concern (IUCN 3.1)

Scientific classification
- Kingdom: Animalia
- Phylum: Chordata
- Class: Aves
- Order: Passeriformes
- Family: Meliphagidae
- Genus: Acanthorhynchus
- Species: A. tenuirostris

Binomial name
- Acanthorhynchus tenuirostris (Latham, 1801)

Subspecies
- Acanthorhynchus tenuirostris cairnsensis Acanthorhynchus tenuirostris dubius Acanthorhynchus tenuirostris halmaturinus Acanthorhynchus tenuirostris tenuirostris

= Eastern spinebill =

Species of bird

The eastern spinebill (Acanthorhynchus tenuirostris) is a species of honeyeater found in eastern Australia from Queensland to Tasmania in forest and woodland areas, as well as gardens in urban areas. It is around 15 cm long, and has a distinctive black, white and chestnut plumage, a red eye, and a long downcurved bill.

== Taxonomy ==
Originally described as Certhia tenuirostris by the English ornithologist John Latham in 1801, it is a member of the small genus Acanthorhynchus with one other, the western spinebill of Western Australia. The generic name is derived from the Greek translation of spinebill, namely acantho-/ακανθο- 'spine' and rhynchos/ρυνχος 'bill'. Its specific epithet is from Latin tenuis 'narrow' and rostrum 'bill'. Other English names include spine-billed honeyeater and awl-bird or cobbler's awl bird. The eastern spinebill is polytypic, consisting of the subspecies A. t. cairnsensis, A. t. dubius, A. t. halmaturinus, and the nominate subspecies A. t. tenuirostris.

The eastern spinebill forms a superspecies with the closely related western spinebill. Scientists believe the two sister species are descended from a shared ancestor whose once widespread populations were separated by climate change. During a past period of desertification, that ancestor species retreated to refuges in the southwestern and southeastern corners of the continent, and evolved into the two present-day spinebill species. Recent DNA studies have shown that the two spinebills belong to a clade which is a sister taxon to all other honeyeaters.

== Description ==
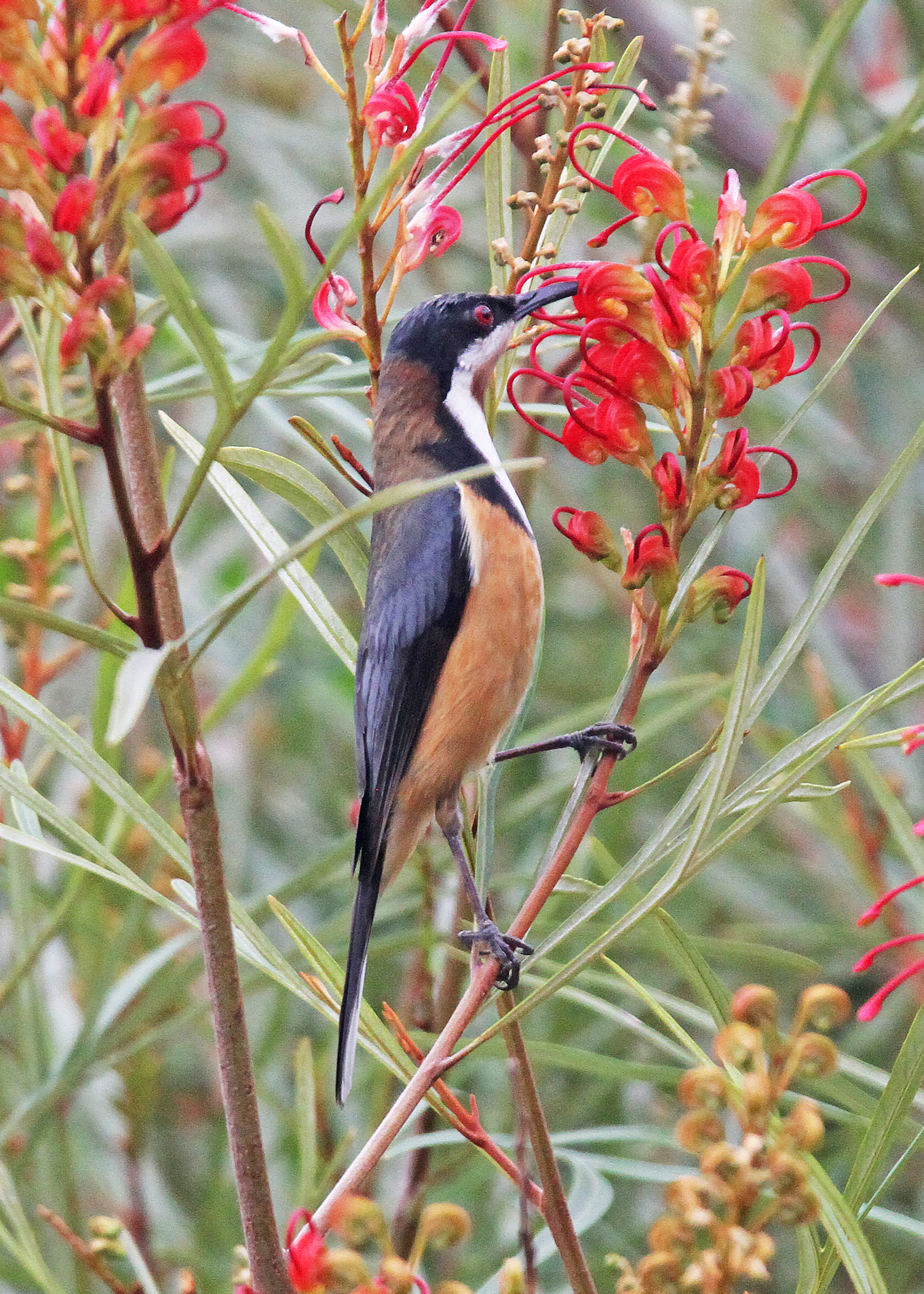
Eastern spinebill feeding on the nectar of a Grevillea flower in Lamington National Park, Queensland, Australia

The male eastern spinebill is 13–16 cm (5–6.5 in) long, and has a long thin downcurved black bill with a black head, white throat with a chestnut patch and red iris. It has a brownish-red nape, a grey-brown back and pale cinnamon underparts. The dark tail is tipped with white laterally. Females are smaller with olive-grey crown, similar in colouring to male but slightly duller; and juveniles are pale warm cinnamon below with grey to olive-brown upperparts, a brown-red eye and orange base to the bill. The call is a clear, high-pitched, staccato piping "chip-chip-chip", sometimes repeated for lengthy periods.

== Distribution and habitat ==
Eastern spinebills are found in dry sclerophyll forest, scrub and heathland from the Cooktown area in North Queensland south through New South Wales east of the Great Dividing Range, through Victoria and into the Flinders Ranges in eastern South Australia as well as throughout Tasmania. Adaptable, they can be found in urban gardens with sufficient vegetation to act as cover and a food source.

== Breeding ==
Breeding season is from August to January, with one or two broods raised. The nest is a deep cup-shaped structure of grass and bark strips, lined with feathers and soft plant fibres, hanging by the rim in the fork of a small bushy tree or shrub, 1–15 m (3–49 ft) above ground. The clutch is one to four, with two being the average, pinkish eggs with dark reddish-brown blotches and spots, 17 mm × 13 mm (0.7 in × 0.5 in) in size. The female incubates the eggs for 13 to 16 days before hatching. Both parents feed the chicks and remove the faecal sacs from the nest.

== Diet ==
The eastern spinebill feeds on nectar from many plants, including the blooms of gum trees, mistletoes Amyema spp., Epacris longiflora, Epacris impressa (common heath), Correa reflexa, and various members of the Proteaceae such as Banksia ericifolia, Banksia integrifolia, Lambertia formosa and Grevillea speciosa, as well as small insects and other invertebrates. A 1982 study in the New England National Park in north-eastern New South Wales found that there was a large influx of birds coinciding with the start of flowering of Banksia spinulosa there. They have been known to feed from exotic plants such as fuchsias.

During periods of abundant flowering there may be periods of low nectar production, and it appears that the eastern spinebill responds to these periodic shortages by storing fat during periods of high nectar production, increasing the amount of time spent feeding, or dropping its day-time metabolic rate to night-time levels.
