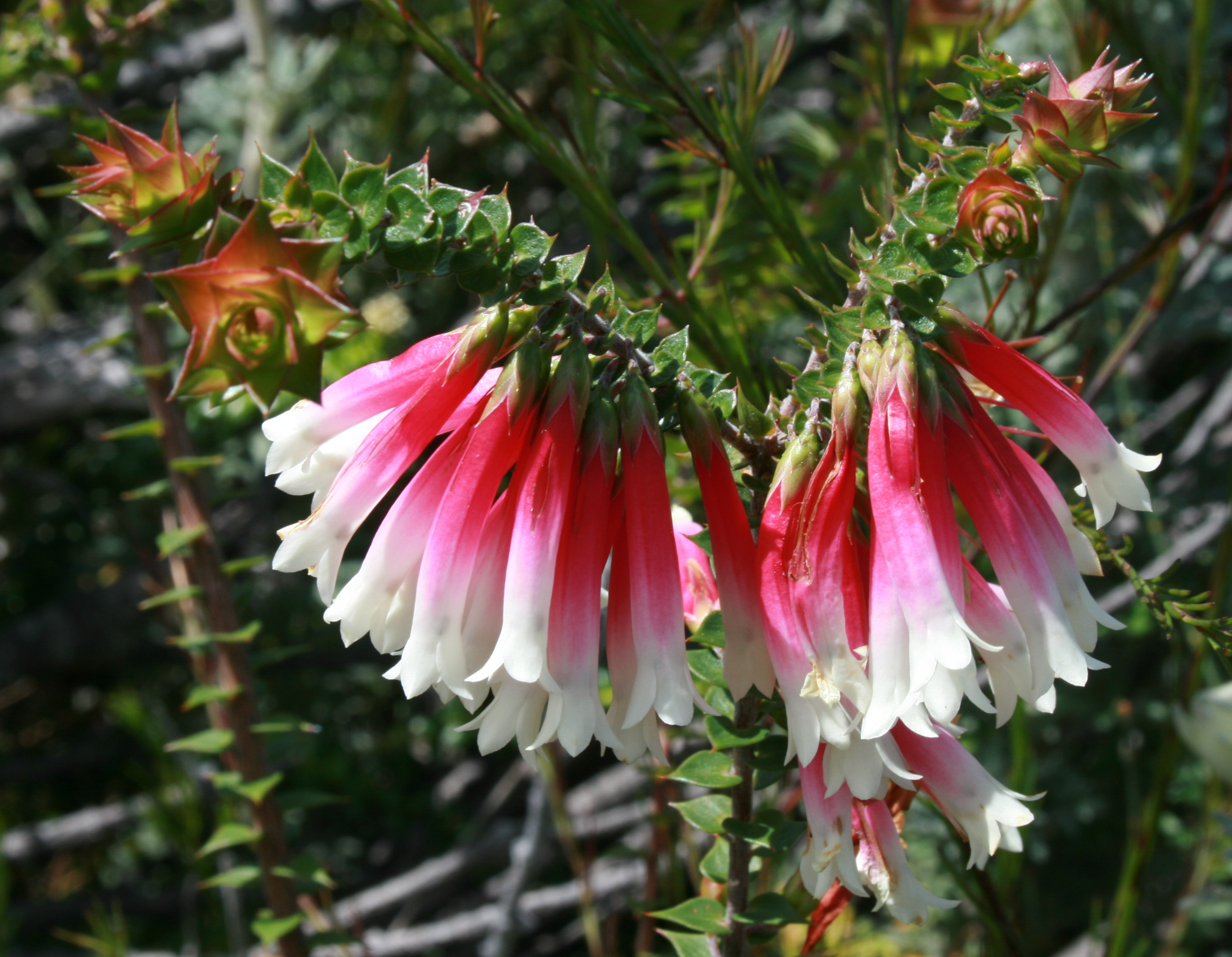
- Epacris longiflora in flower at Grotto Point Reserve, Sydney

Scientific classification
- Kingdom: Plantae
- Clade: Tracheophytes
- Clade: Angiosperms
- Clade: Eudicots
- Clade: Asterids
- Order: Ericales
- Family: Ericaceae
- Genus: Epacris
- Species: E. longiflora

Binomial name
- Epacris longiflora Cav.

Synonyms
- Epacris grandiflora Willd.; Epacris longiflora Cav. f. longiflora; Epacris miniata Lindl. nom. illeg.

= Epacris longiflora =

Fuchsia heath

Species of flowering plant

Epacris longiflora, commonly known as fuchsia heath or cigarette flower, is a plant in the family Ericaceae and is endemic to eastern Australia. It is an erect or spreading shrub with egg-shaped, pointed leaves and red tube-shaped flowers which give the plant its name longiflora and are usually present throughout the year. Its native range extends from the central coast of New South Wales to southern Queensland.

== Description ==
Epacris longiflora is an erect to spreading shrub which grows to a height of 50–200 cm (20–80 in) and has stems with prominent short, broad leaf scars. The leaves are egg-shaped, 5.6–17 mm (0.2–0.7 in) long, 3–6.6 mm (0.1–0.3 in) wide with a pointed tip. The leaves are thin, flat and have margins with minute teeth. The flowers are red with a white tip, sometimes all red and have a peduncle up to 2 mm (0.08 in) long. There are five petals which are fused to form a tube with five lobes at the end. The tube is 12–27 mm (0.5–1 in) long, 5–6 mm (0.20–0.24 in) in diameter and the lobes are 2.4–4.4 mm (0.09–0.2 in) long. At the base of the petal tube there are whorls of bracts and five sepals 4.5–6 mm (0.18–0.24 in) long. Within the petal tube there is a central style with the stigma at its tip and an ovary at its base. The stamens are hidden inside the tube. Flowering occurs throughout the year, although there are fewer flowers in summer. The fruits are capsules 3–4 mm (0.1–0.2 in) long containing small, light seeds.

== Taxonomy and naming ==
Epacris longiflora was first formally described by Antonio José Cavanilles in 1797 and the description was published in his book Icones et descriptiones plantarum. The specific epithet (longiflora) means "long-flowered". The vernacular name "cigarette flower" is from the pattern on the flower.

== Distribution and habitat ==
Fuchsia heath is found on the coast and tablelands from south-eastern Queensland to Berry in New South Wales. It grows in sandy soil on cliff faces, in heath to woodland margins and in dry sclerophyll forest.

== Ecology ==
Plants are thought to live 5–20 years in the wild.

== Use in horticulture ==
A highly regarded ornamental garden plant, E. longiflora was first cultivated in England in 1803. It grows in a variety of soils as long as the drainage is good, and does best in a partly shaded position.

Along with other members of the genus, Epacris longiflora initially proved difficult to grow and maintain on original soil in the Australian National Botanic Gardens in Canberra.
