= Beaumont, Western Australia =

Locality in the Shire of Esperance, Western Australia

Beaumont
- Interactive map of Beaumont
- Coordinates: 33.40028°S 122.80237°E
- Country: Australia
- State: Western Australia
- LGA: Shire of Esperance
- Location: 667 km (414 mi) SE of Perth; 164 km (102 mi) SE of Norseman; 95 km (59 mi) NE of Esperance

Government
  - State electorate: Roe
  - Federal division: O'Connor

Area
  - Total: 1,753 km^{2} (677 sq mi)

Population
  - Total: 53 (SAL 2021)
- Postcode: 6450
Localities around Beaumont
Buraminya	Buraminya	Buraminya
Mount Ney	Beaumont	Howick
Condingup	Howick	Howick

Beaumont is a rural locality of the Shire of Esperance in the Goldfields-Esperance region of Western Australia. The locality is home to six nature reserves. Mount Beaumont, with a height of 276 metres (906 ft), is located in the north-west of Beaumont, just outside the Beaumont Nature Reserve.

The Shire of Esperance and Beaumont, located in its east, stretch over the traditional land of a number of indigenous people, the Wudjari and Njunga people, both of the Noongar nation, in the south and west, the Kalaako people, who are also referred to as the Malba or Malpa, in the north-west, and the Ngadjumaya people in the east.

No major roads traverse the locality but the mostly unsealed Parmango Road passes through Beaumont and connects Condingup with Balladonia Road and Balladonia.

== Nature reserves ==
The following named and unnamed nature reserves are located within Beaumont. All are located within the Mallee bioregion, with Beaumont and Niblick Nature Reserves also stretching into the Esperance Plains bioregion:

- Beaumont Nature Reserve was gazetted on 29 June 1973 and has a size of 117.59 square kilometres (45.40 mi^{2}).
- Clyde Hill Nature Reserve was gazetted on 18 November 1983 and has a size of 16.71 square kilometres (6.45 mi^{2}).
- Muntz Nature Reserve, which also stretches into neighbouring Howick, was gazetted on 29 June 1973 and has a size of 36.18 square kilometres (13.97 mi^{2}).
- Niblick Nature Reserve was gazetted on 2 December 1983 and has a size of 8.39 square kilometres (3.24 mi^{2}).
- Unnamed WA32131 Nature Reserve was gazetted on 29 June 1973 and has a size of 10.58 square kilometres (4.08 mi^{2}).
- Unnamed WA38334 Nature Reserve was gazetted on 10 June 1983 and has a size of 4.08 square kilometres (1.58 mi^{2}).
