= Howick, Western Australia =

Locality in the Shire of Esperance, Western Australia

Howick
- Interactive map of Howick
- Coordinates: 33.64052°S 122.88374°E
- Country: Australia
- State: Western Australia
- LGA: Shire of Esperance
- Location: 677 km (421 mi) SE of Perth; 197 km (122 mi) SE of Norseman; 81 km (50 mi) E of Esperance

Government
  - State electorate: Roe
  - Federal division: O'Connor

Area
  - Total: 1,133.7 km^{2} (437.7 sq mi)

Population
  - Total: 45 (SAL 2021)
- Postcode: 6450
Localities around Howick
Beaumont	Beaumont	Buraminya
Condingup	Howick	Boyatup
Condingup	Southern Ocean	Cape Arid

Howick is a rural locality of the Shire of Esperance in the Goldfields-Esperance region of Western Australia, located on the Southern Ocean. The locality is home to a number of nature reserves and borders the Cape Arid National Park in the east.

Howick is on the traditional land of the Wudjari and Njunga people, both of the Noongar nation.

Only one sealed road passes through Howick, the west–east-running Fisheries Road which connects Esperance to Cape Arid National Park. Access to the locality's coastline is limited to a few unsealed roads and tracks and no road runs along the coastline. The nearest services to Howick are to the west, in Condingup.

Campsites near the coast are available at Membinup Beach, a basic bush camping site, and Alexander Bay. The beaches at Membinup and Alexander Bay are not patrolled by Surf Life Saving Australia but are listed on their website with information on the beach conditions and dangers.

== Nature reserves ==
The following named and unnamed nature reserves are located within Howick:

- Beaumont Nature Reserve was gazetted on 29 June 1973 and has a size of 117.59 square kilometres (45.40 mi^{2}). Only a small section of this reserve is located in Howick; the majority is located in neighbouring Beaumont. It is located in the Mallee and Esperance Plains bioregion.
- Alexander Nature Reserve was gazetted on 20 December 1963 and has a size of 8.07 square kilometres (3.12 mi^{2}). It is located in the Esperance Plains bioregion.
- Muntz Nature Reserve, which also stretches into neighbouring Beaumont, was gazetted on 29 June 1973 and has a size of 36.18 square kilometres (13.97 mi^{2}). It is located in the Mallee bioregion.
- Neredup Nature Reserve was gazetted on 2 August 1974 and has a size of 17.09 square kilometres (6.60 mi^{2}). It is located in the Mallee bioregion.
- Unnamed WA27087 Nature Reserve was gazetted on 20 December 1963 and has a size of 0.38 square kilometres (0.15 mi^{2}). It is located in the Esperance Plains bioregion.
