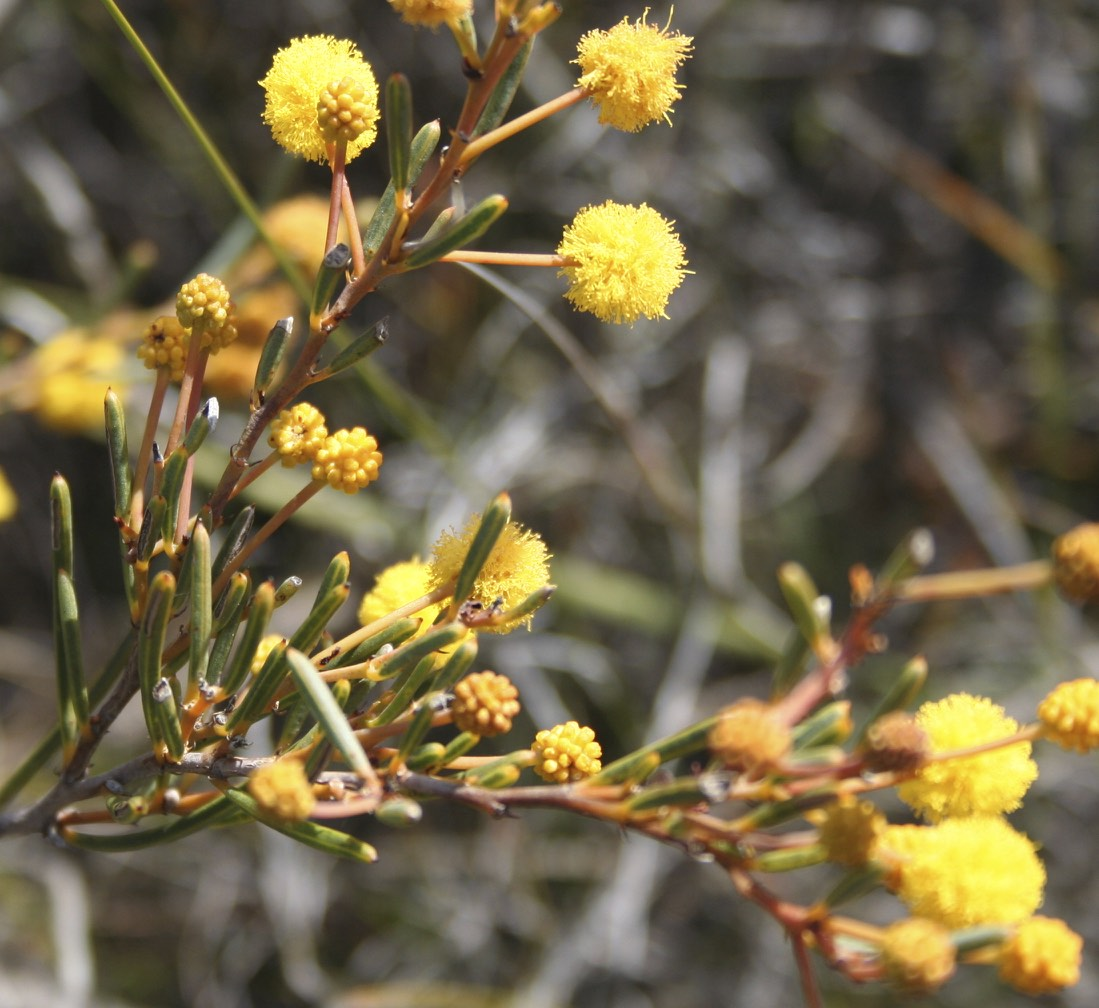
- In Cape Arid National Park

Scientific classification
- Kingdom: Plantae
- Clade: Tracheophytes
- Clade: Angiosperms
- Clade: Eudicots
- Clade: Rosids
- Order: Fabales
- Family: Fabaceae
- Subfamily: Caesalpinioideae
- Clade: Mimosoid clade
- Genus: Acacia
- Species: A. pachyphylla

Binomial name
- Acacia pachyphylla Maslin
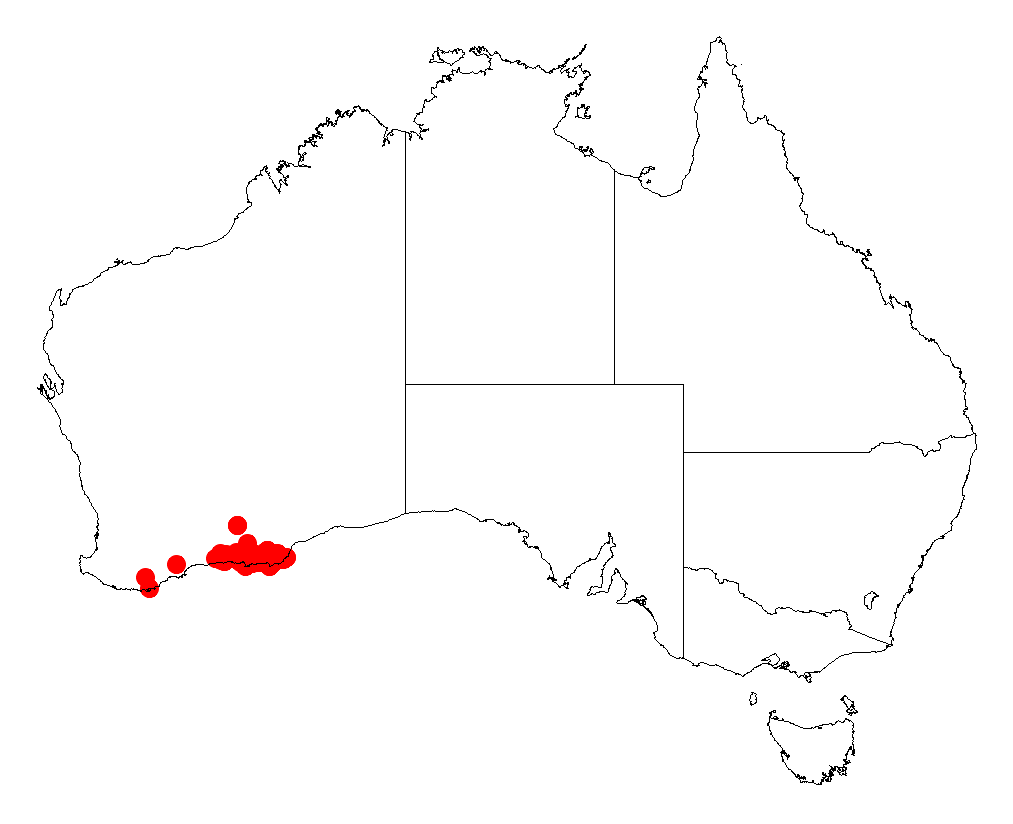
- Occurrence data from AVH

Synonyms
- Acacia gonophylla var. crassifolia Benth.; Racosperma pachyphyllum (Maslin) Pedley

= Acacia pachyphylla =

Species of legume

Acacia pachyphylla is a species of flowering plant in the family Fabaceae, and is endemic to the south of south-western Western Australia. It is a low, spreading, sharply pointed shrub with light grey branchlets, terete sharply pointed phyllodes on the upper branches, and one edge convex and the other straight on lower branches, spherical heads of golden yellow flowers and terete, hard, bony pods.

== Description ==
Acacia pachyphylla is a low, spreading, sharply pointed shrub that typically grows to a height of up 30 cm (12 in) with up to about six main stems at ground level. Its branchlets are light grey and glabrous and reddish at the end. The phyllodes are tere or subterete, four-sided or flat, 1–3 mm (0.039–0.118 in) wide and sharply pointed on the upper branches, and convex on one side, more or less straight the other on the lower branches, 4–7.5 mm (0.16–0.30 in) wide. The phyllodes on the lower branches often fall off as they mature. The phyllodes are ascending to erect, 20–65 mm (0.79–2.56 in) long, thickly leathery and often glaucous with one vein on each face when flat. There are stipules 1.5–3 mm (0.059–0.118 in) long at the base of the phyllodes and a gland 6–7 mm (0.24–0.28 in) above the pulvinus.

The flowers are borne in spherical heads on peduncles mostly 12–30 mm (0.47–1.18 in) long, each head 6.5–8 mm (0.26–0.31 in) in diameter with 36 to 53 golden yellow flowers. Flowering occurs from October to December, and the pods are terete to subterete up to 85 mm (3.3 in) long, 6–8 mm (0.24–0.31 in) wide, hard, bony and more or less covered with a powdery white bloom. The seeds are oblong to broadly elliptic, 4.5–5 mm (0.18–0.20 in) long, dull, dark brown to black with a cap-shaped aril on the end.

== Taxonomy ==
Acacia pachyphylla was first formally described in 1999 by Bruce Maslin in the journal Nuytsia from specimens collected by George Maxwell "towards the Great Bight in south-western Australia". The specific epithet (pachyphylla) means 'thick-leaved'.

== Distribution ==
This species of wattle grows in sand, gravelly sand, sand over clay, loam or clay in open heath or open shrub mallee over heath in flat or gently undulating country in coastal and near-coastal areas from the Young River to Israelite Bay and extending inland as far as Truslove and Buraminya in the Esperance Plains and Mallee bioregions in the south of south-western Western Australia.

== See also ==
- List of Acacia species
