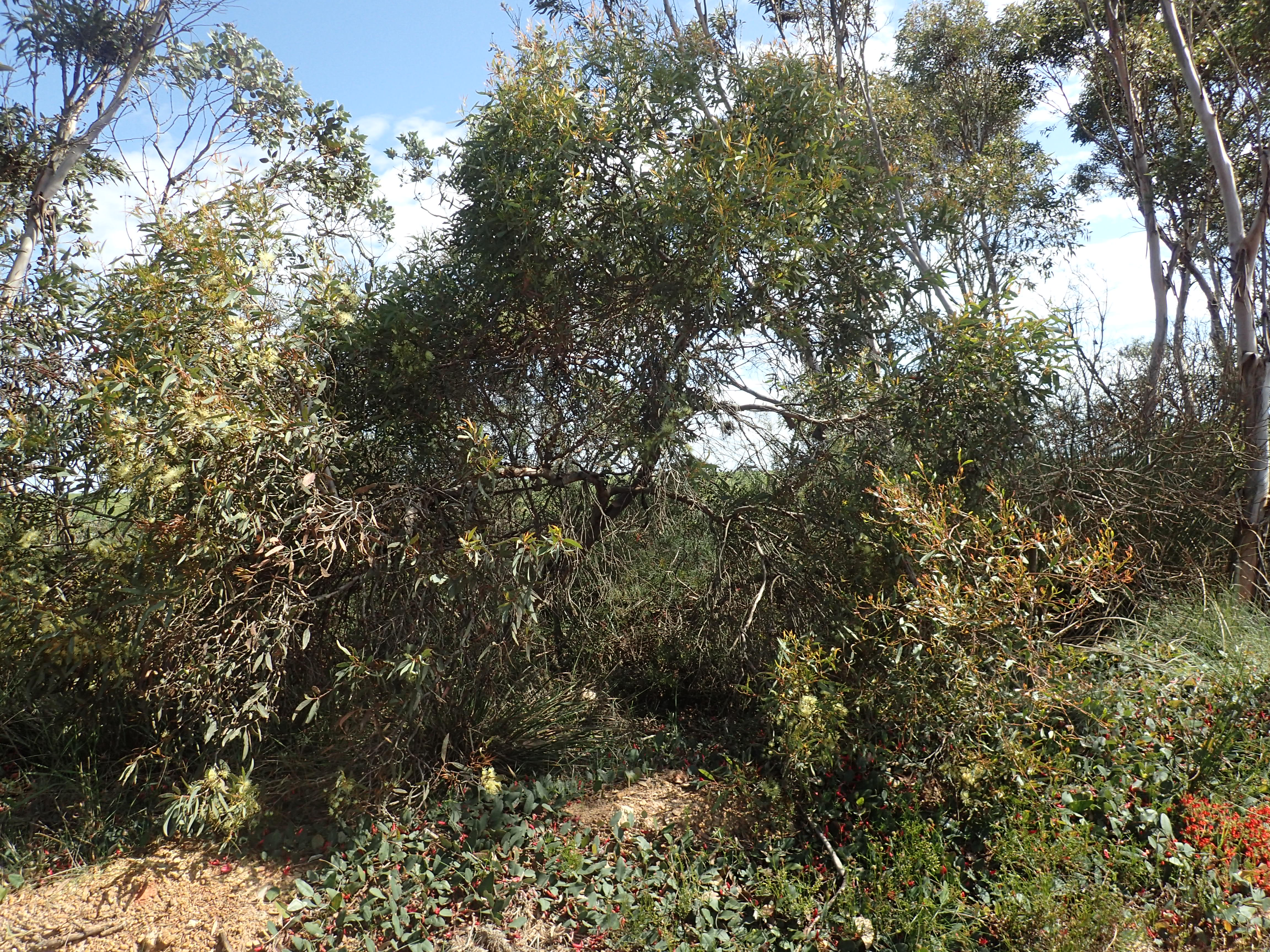
- Near Condingup

Conservation status
- Vulnerable (IUCN 3.1)

Scientific classification
- Kingdom: Plantae
- Clade: Tracheophytes
- Clade: Angiosperms
- Clade: Eudicots
- Clade: Rosids
- Order: Myrtales
- Family: Myrtaceae
- Genus: Eucalyptus
- Species: E. varia

Binomial name
- Eucalyptus varia Brooker & Hopper

= Eucalyptus varia =

Species of eucalyptus

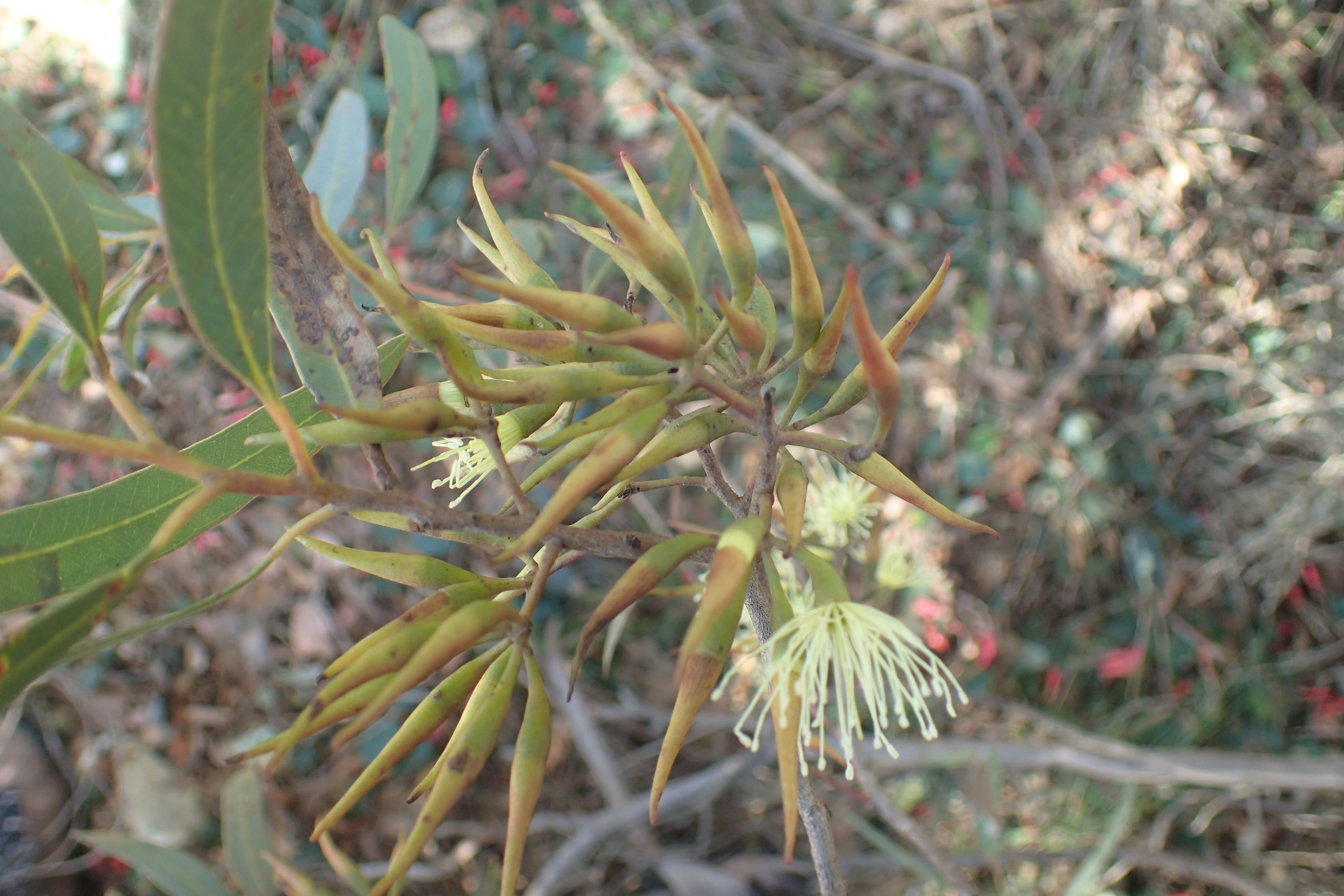
Flower buds

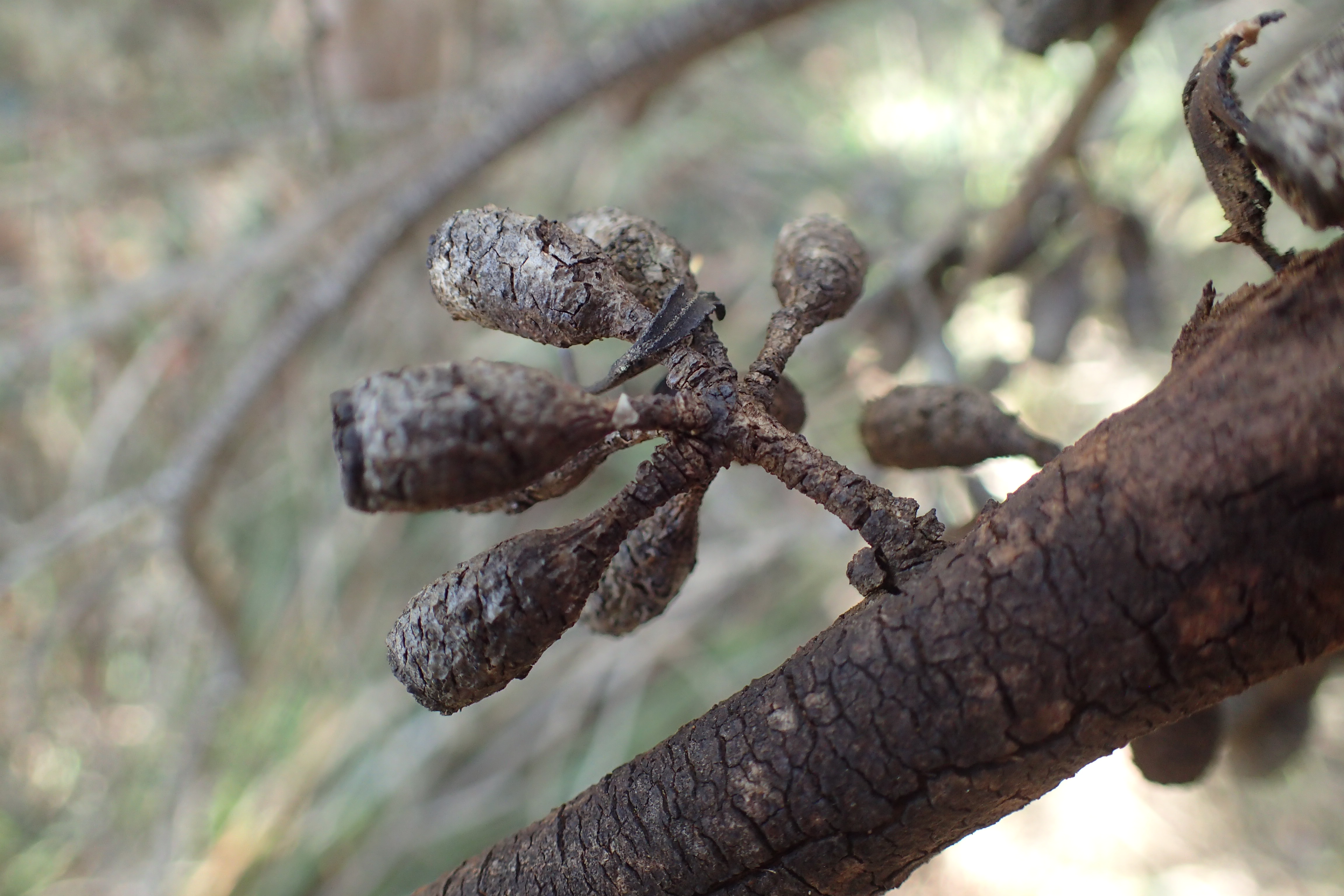
Fruit

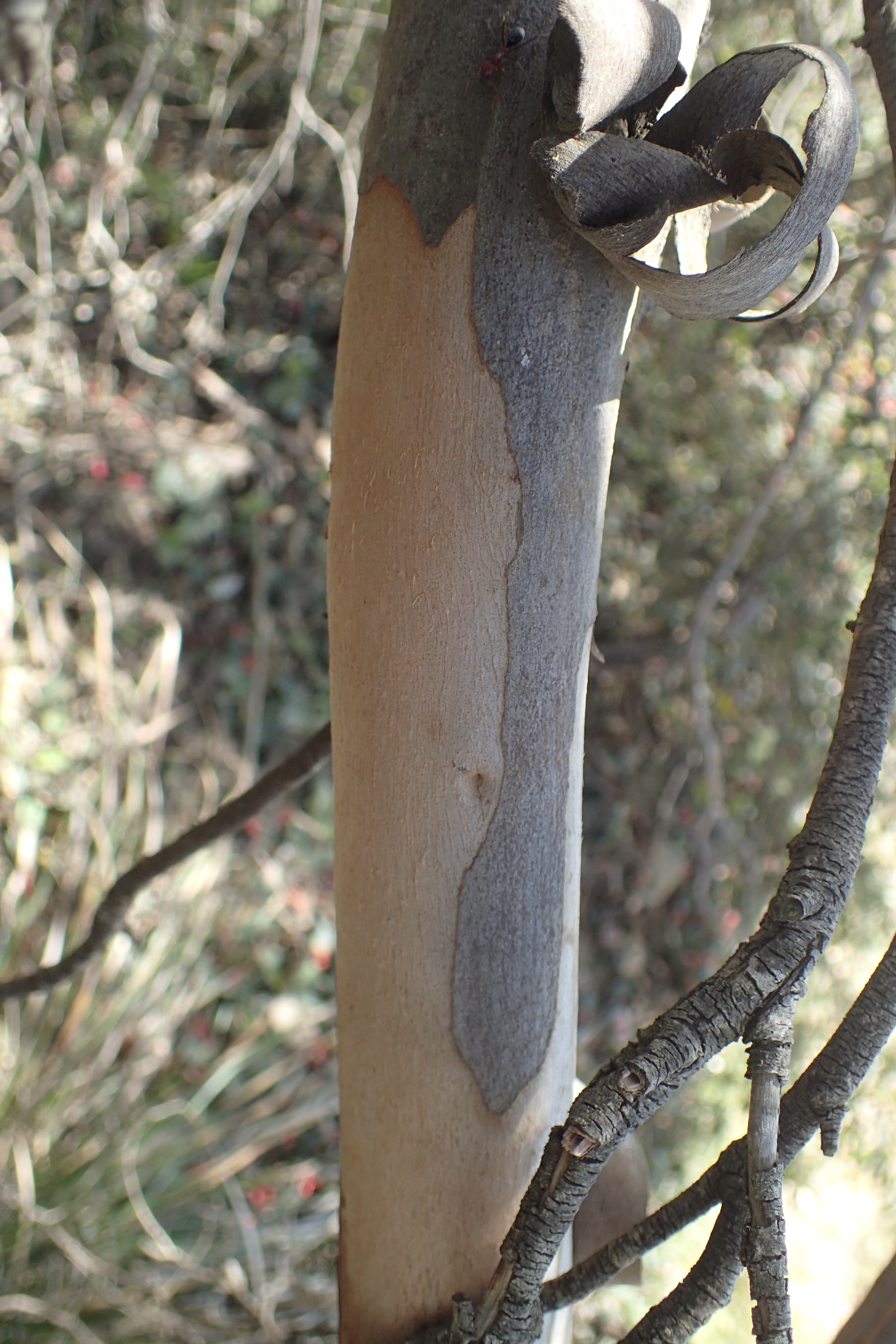
Bark

Eucalyptus varia is a species of mallee that is endemic to an area near the south coast of Western Australia. It has smooth bark, narrow lance-shaped adult leaves, flower buds in groups of nine or eleven, yellow flowers and barrel-shaped to cylindrical fruit.

== Description ==
Eucalyptus varia is a mallee that typically grows to a height of 7 m (23 ft), forms a lignotuber and has smooth grey bark. Adult leaves are the same shade of dull bluish green on both sides, narrow lance-shaped, 48–90 mm (1.9–3.5 in) long and 9–20 mm (0.35–0.79 in) wide tapering to a petiole 8–15 mm (0.31–0.59 in) long. The flower buds are arranged in leaf axils in groups of nine or eleven on an unbranched peduncle 10–17 mm (0.39–0.67 in) long, the individual buds on pedicels 3–5 mm (0.12–0.20 in) long. Mature buds are an elongated spindle shape, 16–27 mm (0.63–1.06 in) long and 2–5 mm (0.079–0.197 in) wide with a horm-shaped operculum that is about three times as long as the floral cup. Flowering occurs from July to September or October and the flowers are yellow. The fruit is a woody, barrel-shaped to cylindrical capsule 7–11 mm (0.28–0.43 in) long and 5–7 mm (0.20–0.28 in) wide with the valves at or below rim level.

== Taxonomy and naming ==
Eucalyptus varia was first formally described in 1991 by Ian Brooker and Stephen Hopper from specimens collected 90 km (56 mi) west of Esperance in 1989. The specific epithet (varia) is from the Latin word "varia", meaning "varying", referring to the varying habit, bark, leaf width and habitat of this species.

In the same journal, Brooker and Hopper described two subspecies and the names have been accepted by the Australian Plant Census:

- Eucalyptus varia subsp. salsuginosa Brooker & Hopper has rough, fibrous bark near the base and occurs on seasonally wet flats north and north-east of Esperance;
- Eucalyptus varia Brooker & Hopper subsp. varia is smooth barked throughout and occurs on sandplains and laterite, north and north-west of Esperance and as far east as the Cape Arid National Park.

== Conservation status ==
This species of eucalypt and both subspecies are classified as "not threatened" by the Western Australian Government Department of Parks and Wildlife. The IUCN Red List assesses the species as Vulnerable.

== See also ==
- List of Eucalyptus species
