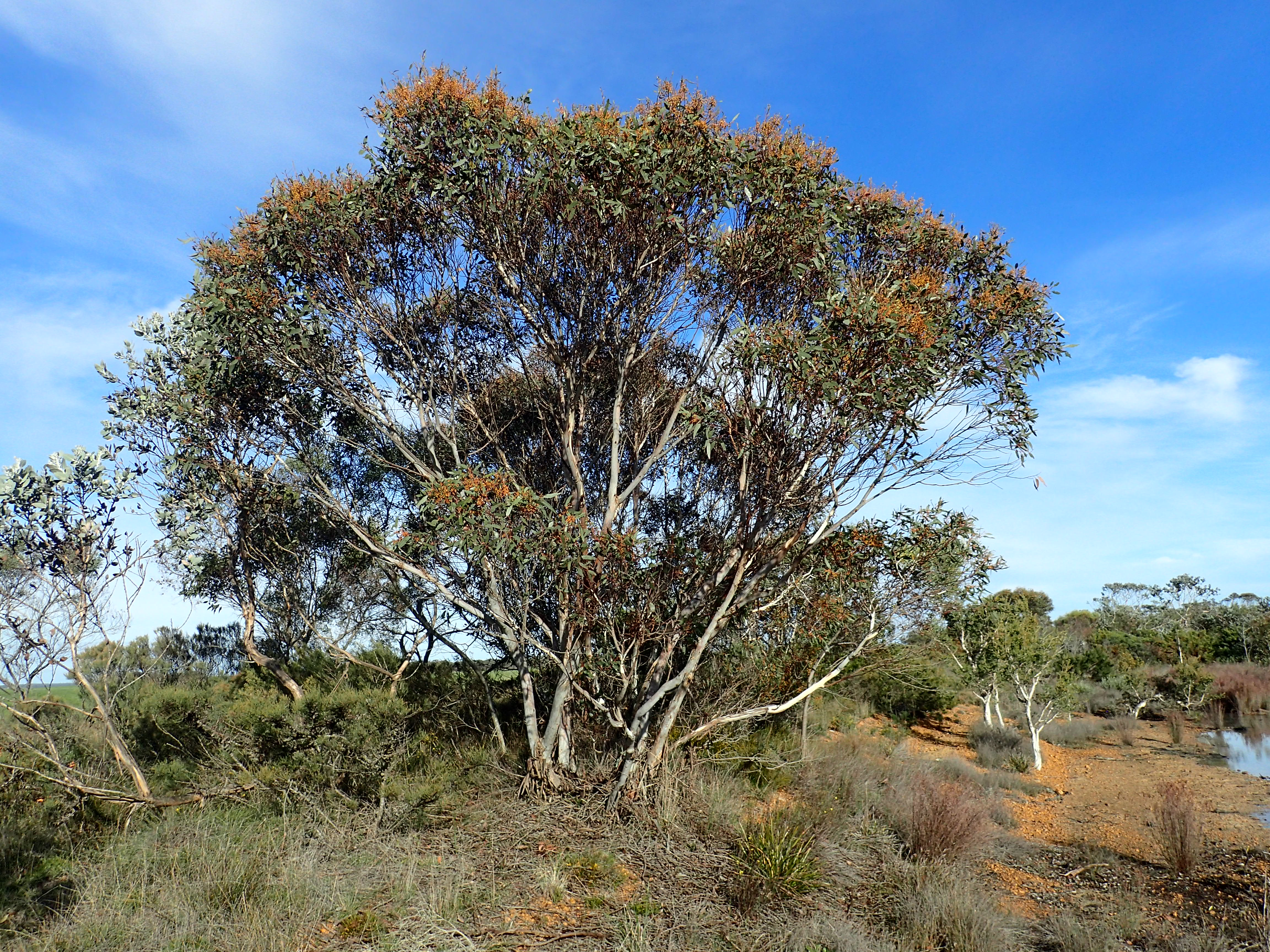
- Eucalyptus cooperiana near Condingup, Western Australia

Conservation status
- Least Concern (IUCN 3.1)

Scientific classification
- Kingdom: Plantae
- Clade: Embryophytes
- Clade: Tracheophytes
- Clade: Spermatophytes
- Clade: Angiosperms
- Clade: Eudicots
- Clade: Rosids
- Order: Myrtales
- Family: Myrtaceae
- Genus: Eucalyptus
- Species: E. cooperiana

Binomial name
- Eucalyptus cooperiana F.Muell.

= Eucalyptus cooperiana =

Many flowered mallee

Species of eucalyptus

Eucalyptus cooperiana, commonly known as the many-flowered mallee, is a species of mallee that is endemic to an area along the south coast of Western Australia. It is described as being "of striking appearance by reason of its smooth, white bark and acutely angled branchlets". It has lance-shaped adult leaves, flower buds in groups of between nine and thirteen or more, creamy yellow flowers and urn-shaped fruit.

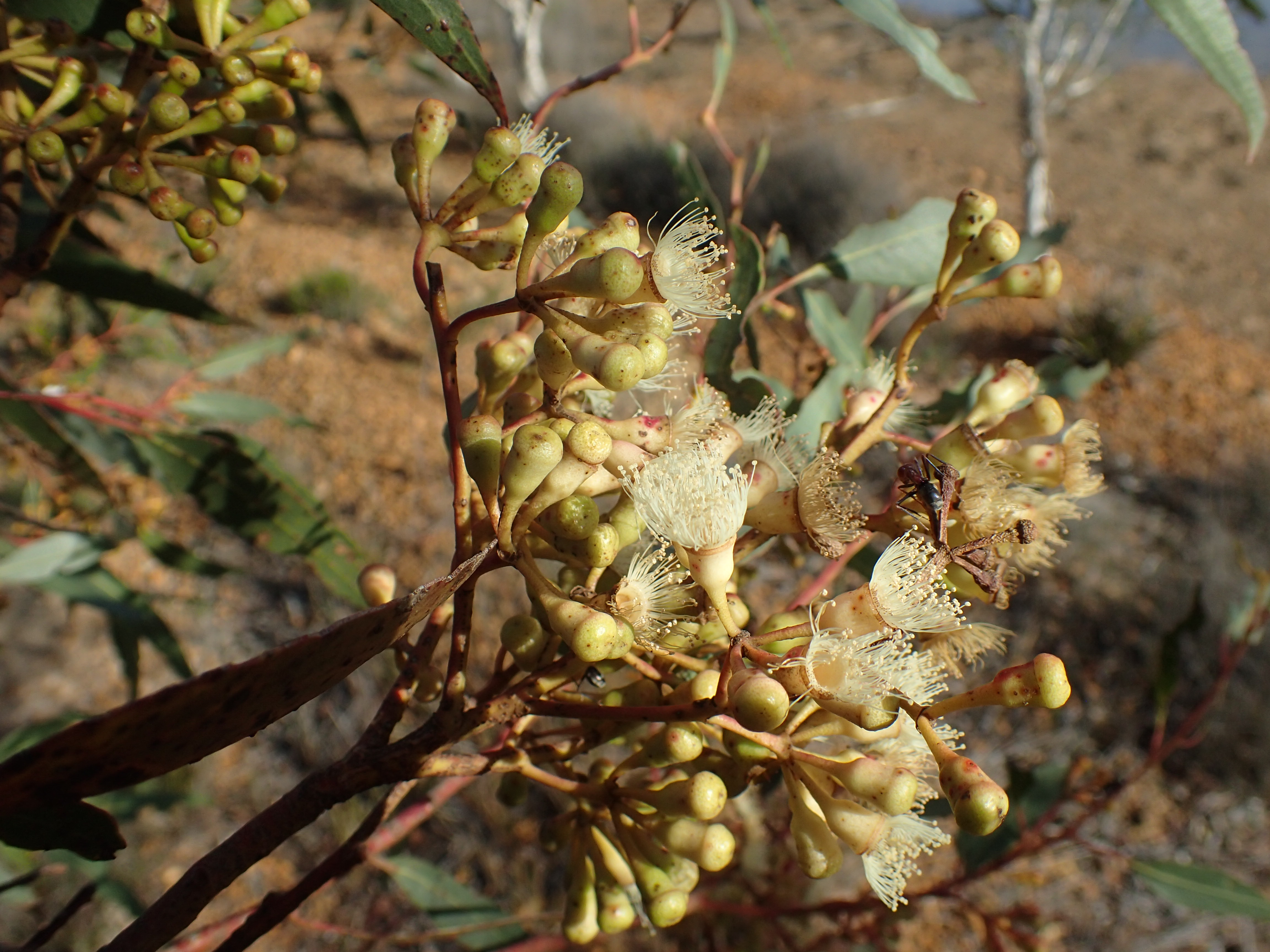
Flowers and flower buds

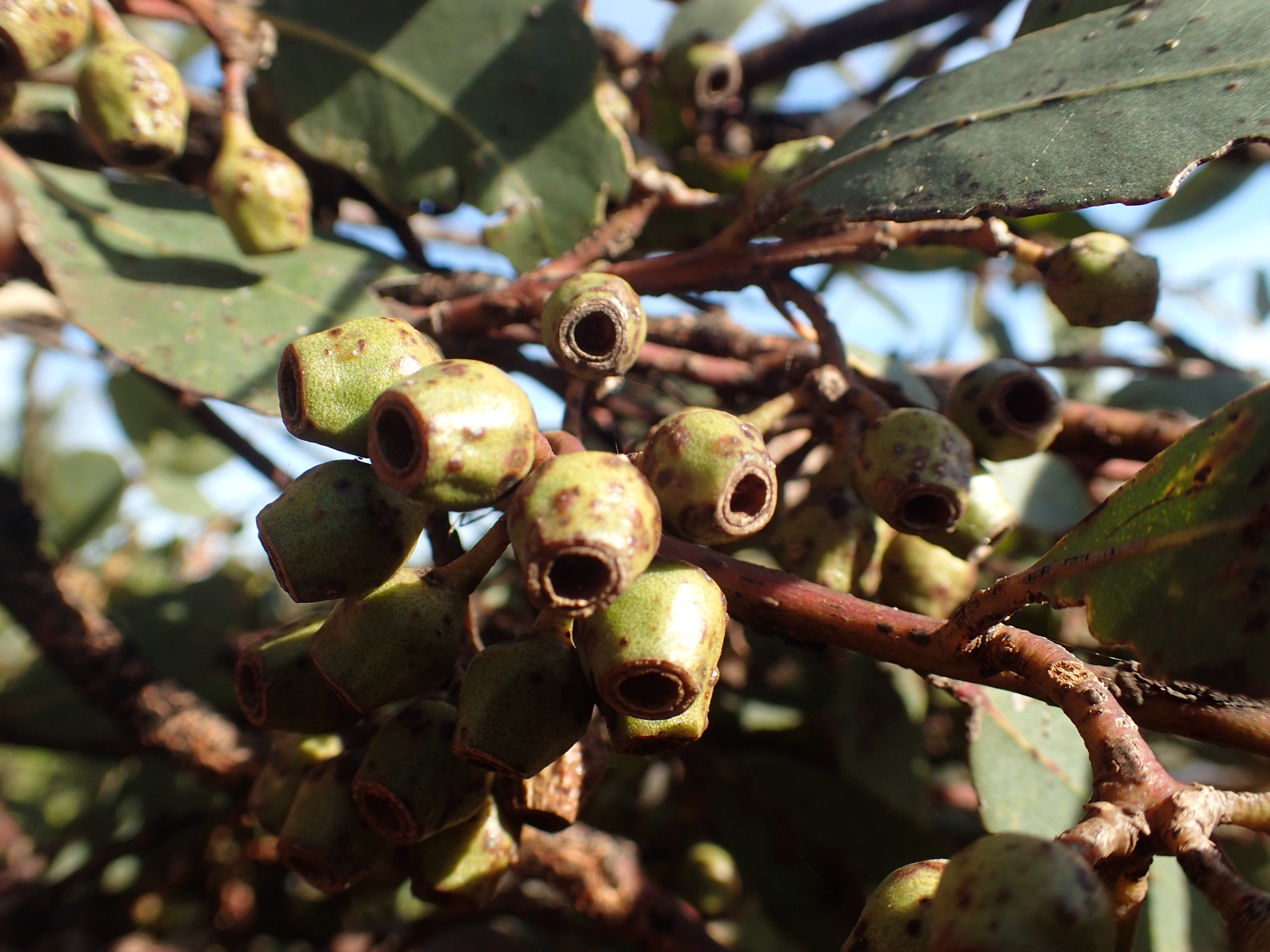
Fruit

== Description ==
Eucalyptus cooperiana is a mallee that typically grows to a height of 2–5 m (6 ft 7 in – 16 ft 5 in) and has a lignotuber. The bark is smooth, powdery and white over pale grey to pinkish over most of the tree with some rough grey fibrous bark at the base. Charles Gardner described the species as being "of striking appearance by reason of its smooth, white bark and acutely angled branchlets". Young plant and coppice regrowth have sessile, elliptic to lance-shaped leaves arranged in opposite pairs, 35–100 mm (1.4–3.9 in) long and 25–60 mm (0.98–2.36 in) wide. Adult leaves are arranged alternately, lance-shaped, the same glossy green or bluish on both sides, 65–105 mm (2.6–4.1 in) long and 10–25 mm (0.39–0.98 in) wide on a petiole 13–28 mm (0.51–1.10 in) long. The flower buds are arranged in groups of nine, eleven or thirteen or more in leaf axils on a downturned peduncle 7–18 mm (0.28–0.71 in) long, the individual buds on a pedicel 4–9 mm (0.16–0.35 in) long. Mature buds are oval or cylindrical, 6–11 mm (0.24–0.43 in) long and 4–5 mm (0.16–0.20 in) wide with a flattened to rounded operculum that is shorter than the floral cup. Flowering occurs between October and December or between January and March and the flowers are creamy yellow. The fruit is a woody, urn-shaped capsule 5–10 mm (0.20–0.39 in) long and 7–9 mm (0.28–0.35 in) wide on a down-turned pedicel 4–7 mm (0.16–0.28 in) long.

== Taxonomy and naming ==
Eucalyptus cooperiana was first formally described by the botanist Ferdinand von Mueller in 1880 as part of the work Fragmenta Phytographiae Australiae. The type specimen was collected by George Maxwell. The specific epithet (cooperiana) honours Ellwood Cooper, a Californian horticulturalist, who introduced many species of Eucalyptus to the United States and wrote Forest Culture and Eucalyptus trees.

== Distribution and habitat ==
The many-flowered mallee is found on sand plains along south coast of Western Australia between Esperance and Israelite Bayin the Goldfields-Esperance region where it grows in sandy-clay soils over limestone.

== Conservation status ==
This eucalypt is classified as "not threatened" by the Government of Western Australia Department of Parks and Wildlife.

== See also ==
- List of Eucalyptus species
