= Buraminya, Western Australia =

Locality in the Shire of Esperance, Western Australia

Buraminya
- Interactive map of Buraminya
- Coordinates: 32.90671°S 122.89332°E
- Country: Australia
- State: Western Australia
- LGA: Shire of Esperance
- Location: 616 km (383 mi) SE of Perth; 104 km (65 mi) SE of Norseman; 100 km (62 mi) N of Esperance

Government
  - State electorate: Roe
  - Federal division: O'Connor

Area
  - Total: 13,493.8 km^{2} (5,210.0 sq mi)

Population
  - Total: 0 (SAL 2016)
- Postcode: 6452

Buraminya is a rural locality of the Shire of Esperance in the Goldfields-Esperance region of Western Australia. The locality is largely uninhabited and is extensively covered by protected areas, including the Dundas Nature Reserve and the Ngadju Indigenous Protected Area. Mount Buraminya, with a height of 233 metres (764 ft), is located in the south of Buraminya. Buraminya's eastern and south-eastern borders are formed by the boundary of Nuytsland Nature Reserve and Cape Arid National Park.

== History ==
The Shire of Esperance and Buraminya, located in its east, stretch over the traditional land of a number of indigenous peoples, the Wudjari and Njunga people, both of the Noongar nation, in the south and west, the Kalaako people, who are also referred to as the Malba or Malpa, in the north-west, and the Ngadjumaya people in the east.

Mount Buraminya was a western waypoint of the Aboriginal trade routes in the area that connected South and Western Australia, with the route swinging north from there.

The Dundas Nature Reserve was gazetted on 13 February 1981, has a size of 7,808.83 square kilometres (3,015.01 sq mi) and is located in the Coolgardie and Mallee bioregions.

The heritage listed Deralinya Station is located in the east of Buraminya. The homestead was used as an outstation to Balladonia Station and dates back to 1890. Wool was produced there until the 1920s and the last cattle left the station in 1936, after which the roof of the building was removed. It has since been replaced. Further east, the Balbinya Station was active from 1883 to the 1940s. Similarly to Deralinya, the building had its roof removed but replaced again in the 1990s. The area had originally been surveyed by Alexander Forrest in the 1870s.

No major roads traverse the locality. The mostly unsealed Parmango Road connects Condingup with Balladonia Road and Balladonia via Buraminya and the Deralinya Station. The heritage listed Burraburinya Dam is also located on Parmango Road. The dam is at a large granite rock and was used to supply water for growing hay and breeding sheep and horses but was abandoned in 1949.
