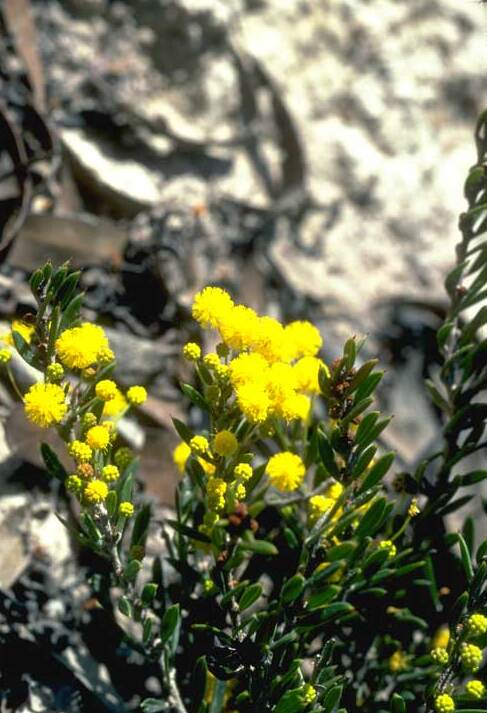

Scientific classification
- Kingdom: Plantae
- Clade: Tracheophytes
- Clade: Angiosperms
- Clade: Eudicots
- Clade: Rosids
- Order: Fabales
- Family: Fabaceae
- Subfamily: Caesalpinioideae
- Clade: Mimosoid clade
- Genus: Acacia
- Species: A. excentrica

Binomial name
- Acacia excentrica Maiden & Blakely
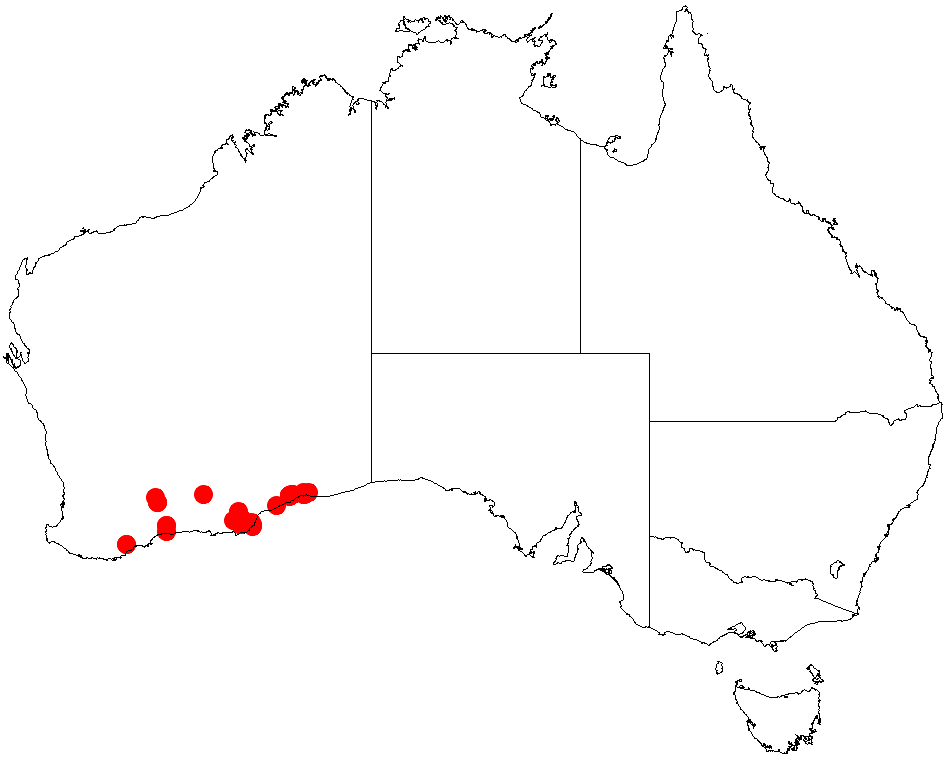
- Occurrence data from AVH

Synonyms
- Racosperma excentricum (Maiden & Blakely) Pedley

= Acacia excentrica =

Species of legume

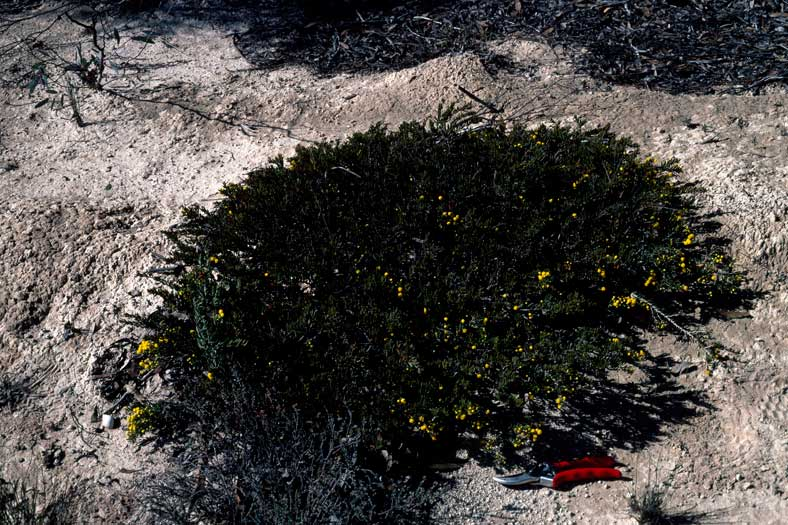
Habit in Cape Arid National Park

Acacia excentrica is a species of flowering plant in the family Fabaceae and is endemic to the south of Western Australia. It is a prostrate, domed to spreading, prickly shrub with hairy branchlets when young, narrowly elliptic to oblong or lance-shaped phyllodes, spherical heads of golden yellow flowers and coiled pods.

== Description ==
Acacia excentrica is prostrate, domed or spreading, prickly subshrub that typically grows to a height of 10–50 cm (3.9–19.7 in). Its young branchlets are covered with soft or shaggy hairs but become glabrous with age. The phyllodes are more or less crowded, glabrous, leathery, narrowly elliptic to oblong, occasionally lance-shaped, 10–20 mm (0.39–0.79 in) long and 2–5 mm (0.079–0.197 in) wide with a coarsely to sharply pointed tip. There are stipules are 1–2 mm (0.039–0.079 in) long at the base of the phyllodes. The flowers are borne in one or two spherical heads in axils on a glabrous peduncle 7–15 mm (0.28–0.59 in) long. The heads are 4.0–4.5 mm (0.16–0.18 in) in diameter with 20 to 30 golden yellow flowers. Flowering occurs from July to October, and the immature pods are linear and coiled.

== Taxonomy ==
Acacia excentrica was first formally described in 1928 by Joseph Maiden and William Blakely in the Journal of the Royal Society of Western Australia from specimens collected at Israelite Bay by John Paul Brooks in 1915. The specific epithet (excentrica) means 'not central', referring to the midrib of the phyllodes.

== Distribution ==
This species of wattle occurs from near Mount Ragged in the Cape Arid National Park to near Cocklebiddy, with a glabrous variant near Ravensthorpe, where it grows in loamy or sandy clay soils over limestone, in the Coolgardie, Esperance Plains and Mallee bioregions of southern Western Australia.

== Conservation status ==
Acacia excentrica is listed as "not threatened" by the Government of Western Australia Department of Biodiversity, Conservation and Attractions.

== See also ==
- List of Acacia species
