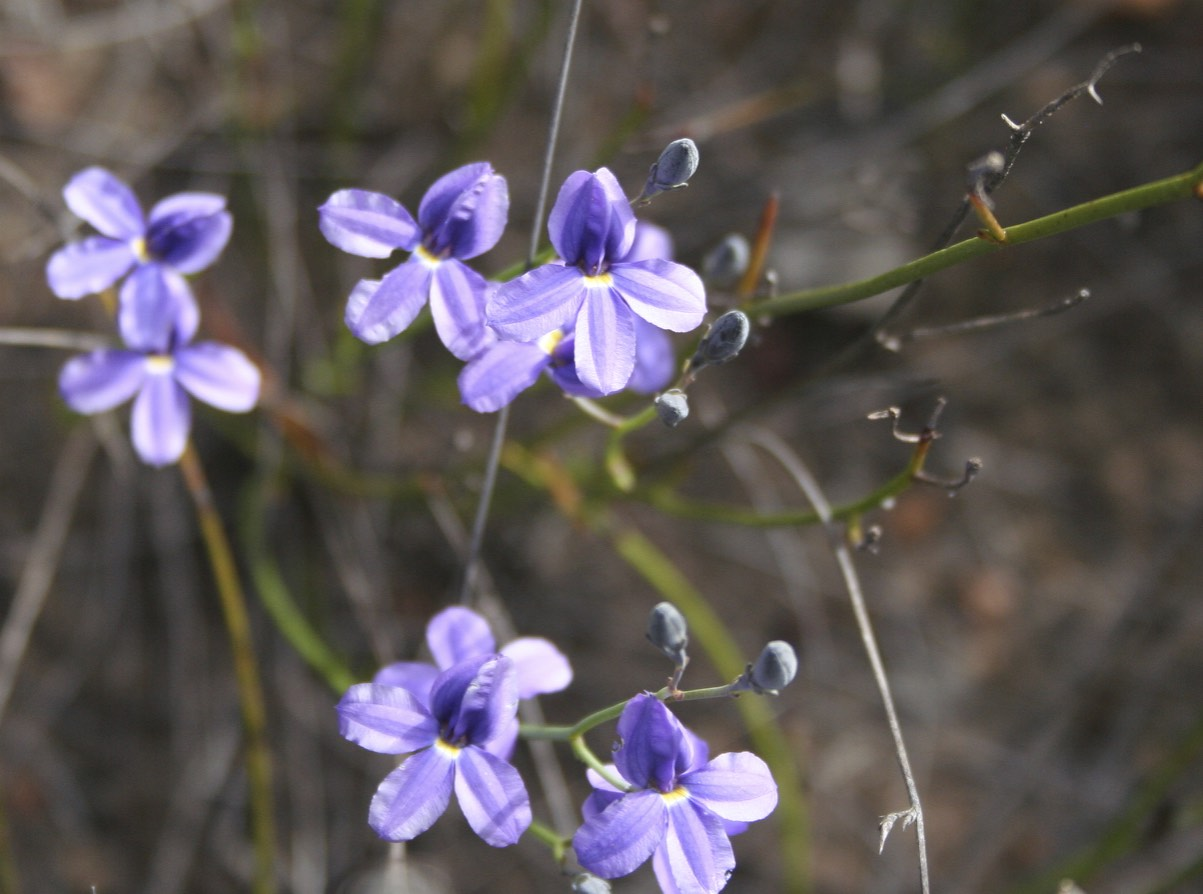
- Near Condingup

Scientific classification
- Kingdom: Plantae
- Clade: Tracheophytes
- Clade: Angiosperms
- Clade: Eudicots
- Clade: Asterids
- Order: Asterales
- Family: Goodeniaceae
- Genus: Goodenia
- Species: G. pterigosperma

Binomial name
- Goodenia pterigosperma R.Br.

Synonyms
- Goodenia cyanea F.Muell.

= Goodenia pterigosperma =

Species of plant

Goodenia pterigosperma is a species of flowering plant in the family Goodeniaceae and is endemic to south-coastal areas in the south-west of Western Australia. It is an erect to sprawling, glabrous perennial herb or shrub with linear to lance-shaped leaves mostly at the base of the plant, and racemes of dark blue flowers.

== Description ==
Goodenia pterigosperma is an erect to sprawling glabrous perennial herb or shrub that typically grows to a height of 40 cm (16 in). The leaves are linear to lance-shaped with the narrower end towards the base, mostly arranged at the base of the plant, 20–50 mm (0.79–1.97 in) long and 3–8 mm (0.12–0.31 in) wide. The edges of the leaves are rolled inwards with a few teeth. The flowers are arranged in racemes up to 200 mm (7.9 in) long, with linear bracteoles 1.5–2 mm (0.059–0.079 in) long. Each flower is on a pedicel 1–5 mm (0.039–0.197 in) long with oblong sepals 1–2.5 mm (0.039–0.098 in) long. The petals are dark blue, 12–14 mm (0.47–0.55 in) long, the lower lobes of the corolla 8–9 mm (0.31–0.35 in) long with wings 2–2.5 mm (0.079–0.098 in) wide. Flowering occurs from September to January and the fruit is an oval capsule about 6 mm (0.24 in) long.

== Taxonomy and naming ==
Goodenia pterigosperma was first formally described in 1810 by Robert Brown in his Prodromus Florae Novae Hollandiae et Insulae Van Diemen. The specific epithet (pterigosperma) means "wing-seeded".

== Distribution and habitat ==
This goodenia grows in sandy soil in heath and woodland, occurring near the coast in the south-west of Western Australia, between Jerramungup and Israelite Bay.
