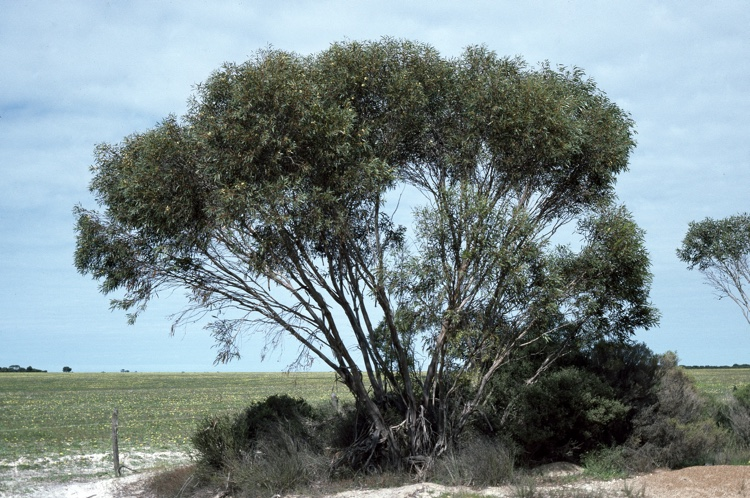
- Eucalyptus micranthera near Scaddan

Conservation status
- Near Threatened (IUCN 3.1)

Scientific classification
- Kingdom: Plantae
- Clade: Tracheophytes
- Clade: Angiosperms
- Clade: Eudicots
- Clade: Rosids
- Order: Myrtales
- Family: Myrtaceae
- Genus: Eucalyptus
- Species: E. micranthera

Binomial name
- Eucalyptus micranthera Benth.

= Eucalyptus micranthera =

Alexander River mallee

Species of eucalyptus

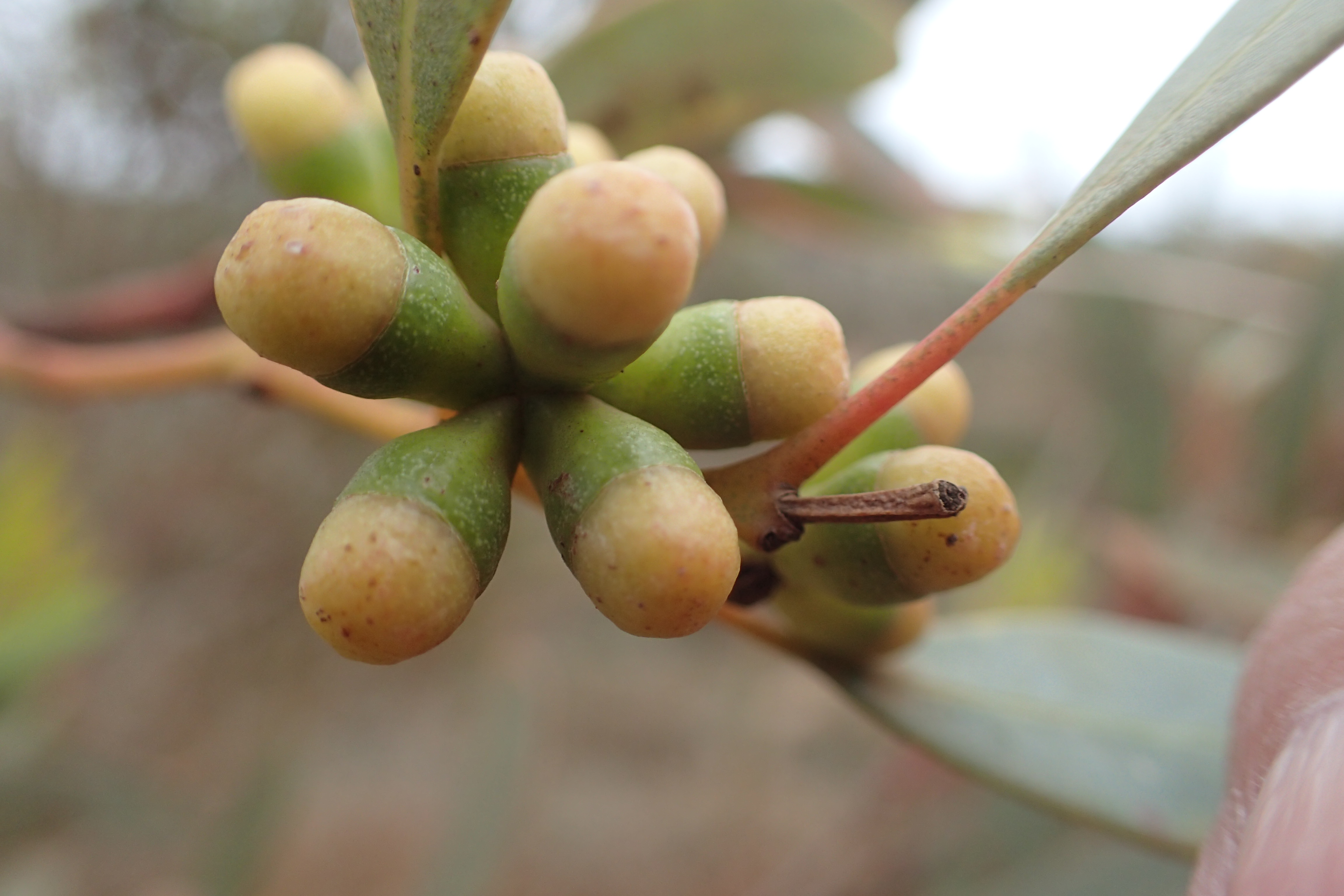
Flower buds

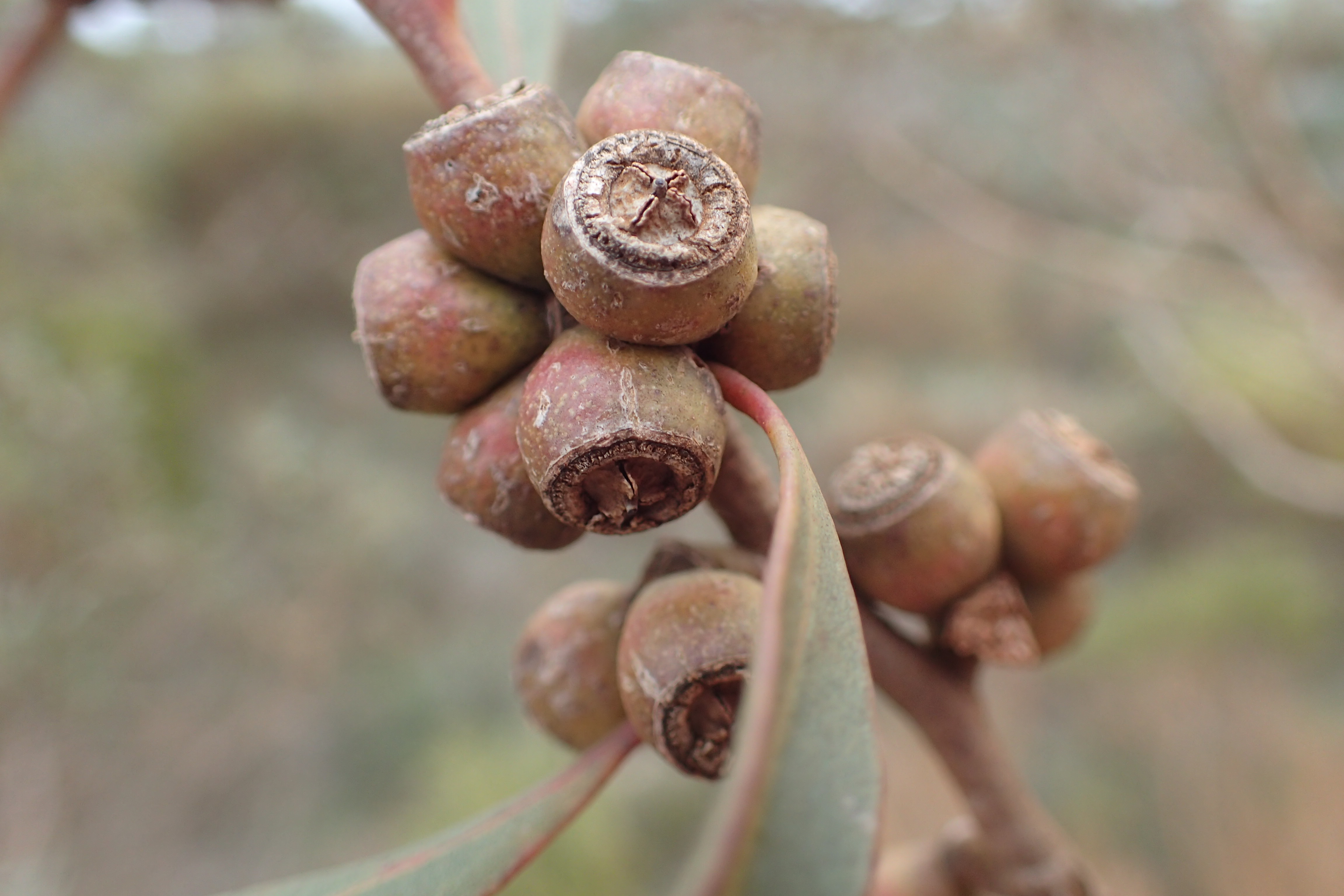
Fruit

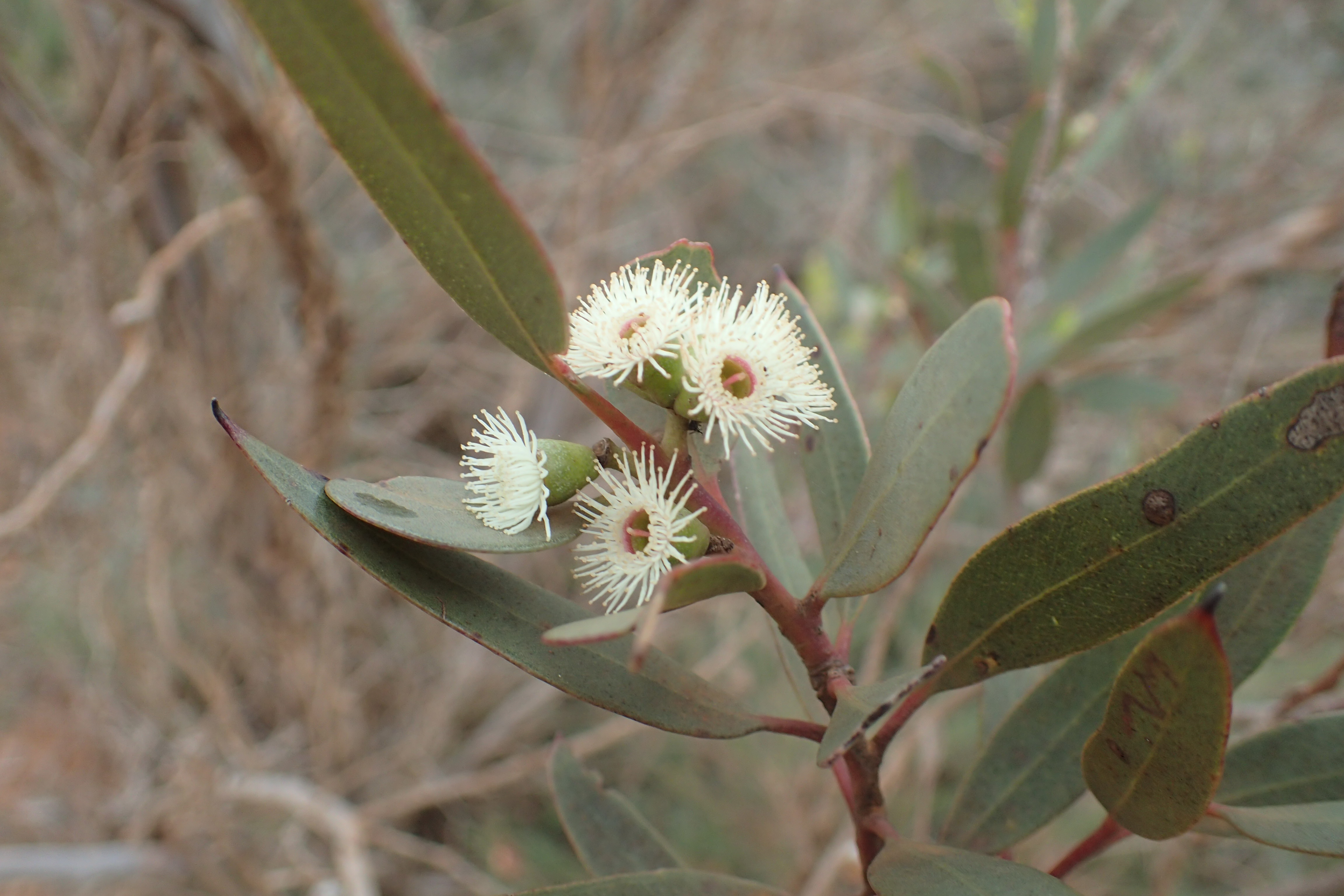
Flowers

Eucalyptus micranthera, commonly known as the Alexander River mallee or milkshake mallee, is a species of mallee that is endemic to a small area along the south coast of Western Australia. It has smooth bark, lance-shaped adult leaves, flower buds in groups of seven or nine, creamy white flowers and more or less hemispherical fruit.

== Description ==
Eucalyptus micranthera is a mallee that typically grows to a height of 0.6–6 m (2 ft 0 in – 19 ft 8 in) and forms a lignotuber. The bark is smooth with a light to pinkish grey and yellow-grey colour and is shed in long thin ribbons. Young plants and coppice regrowth have greyish green to light green leaves that are lance-shaped, up to 90 mm (3.5 in) long and 15 mm (0.59 in) wide. Adult leaves are arranged alternately, glossy green to grey-green, narrow lance-shaped to lance-shaped, 57–120 mm (2.2–4.7 in) long and 08–25 mm (0.31–0.98 in) wide. The flower buds are arranged in groups of seven or nine on an unbranched peduncle 2–10 mm (0.079–0.394 in) long, the individual buds sessile or on pedicels up to 2 mm (0.079 in) long. Mature buds are oval, 7–10 mm (0.28–0.39 in) long and 4–7 mm (0.16–0.28 in) wide with a conical to rounded operculum. Flowering occurs between March and November and the flowers are white, often smelling like bananas. The fruit is a woody, more or less hemispherical capsule 6–10 mm (0.24–0.39 in) long and 7–10 mm (0.28–0.39 in) wide with the valves near rim level.

== Taxonomy and naming ==
Eucalyptus micranthera was first formally described by the botanist George Bentham in 1867 in Flora Australiensis, from specimens collected between "Eyre's Relief" and Israelite Bay by George Maxwell. The specific epithet (micranthera) is from the Greek micro- meaning "little" or "small" and the Latin anthera meaning "anther".

== Distribution and habitat ==
Alexander River mallee occurs in an area along the south coast in the Great Southern and Goldfields-Esperance regions between around Nyabing in the west to around Cape Arid National Park in the east where it is found on flats and slightly undulating areas growing in sandy soils over or around laterite.

== Conservation status ==
This eucalypt is classified as "not threatened" by the Government of Western Australia Department of Parks and Wildlife.

== See also ==
- List of Eucalyptus species
