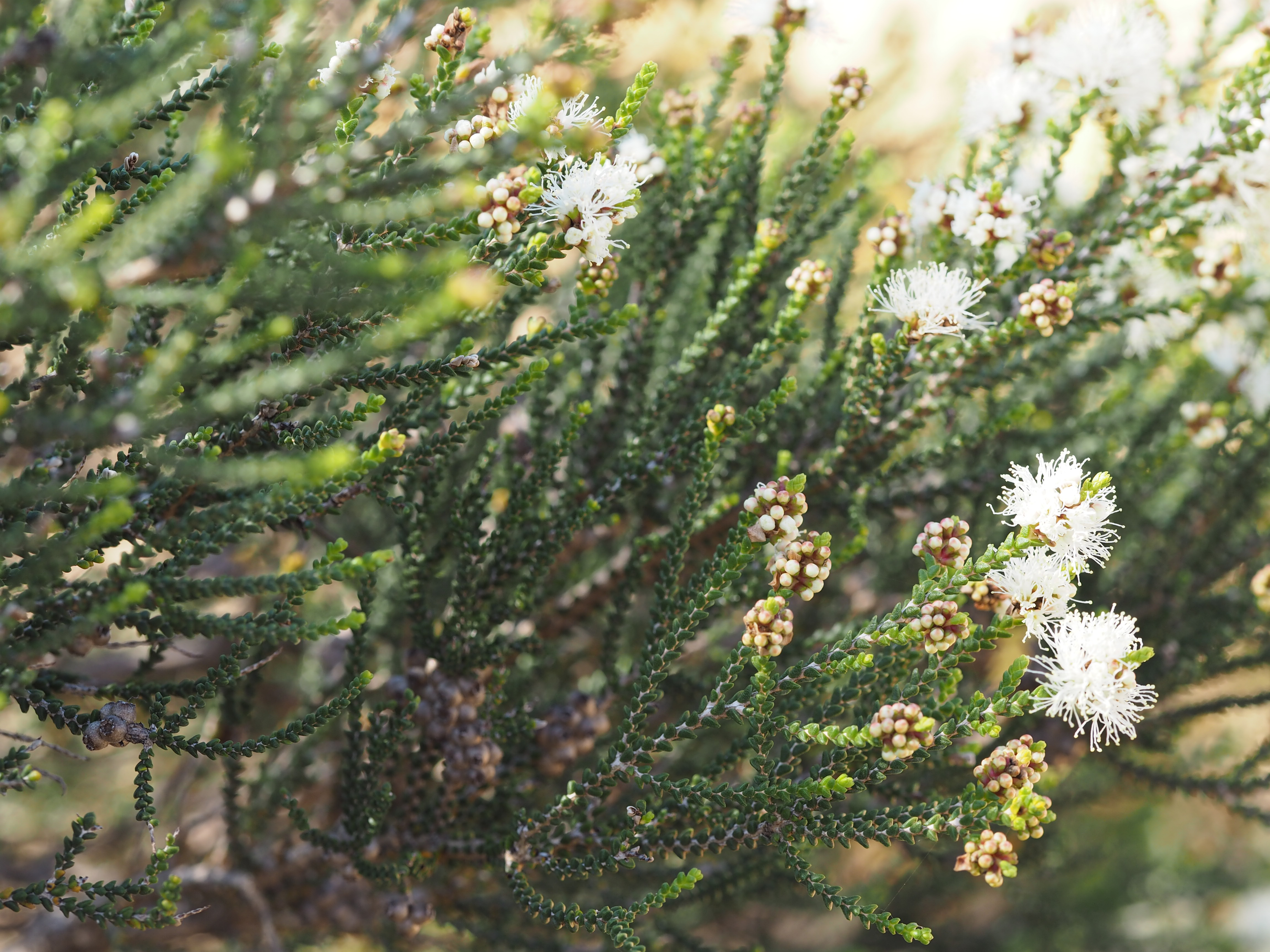

Scientific classification
- Kingdom: Plantae
- Clade: Tracheophytes
- Clade: Angiosperms
- Clade: Eudicots
- Clade: Rosids
- Order: Myrtales
- Family: Myrtaceae
- Genus: Melaleuca
- Species: M. cucullata

Binomial name
- Melaleuca cucullata Turcz.

Synonyms
- Melaleuca deltoidea Benth.; Myrtoleucodendron deltoideum (Benth.) Kuntze

= Melaleuca cucullata =

Species of shrub

Melaleuca cucullata is a large shrub in the myrtle family, Myrtaceae and is endemic to the south-west of Western Australia. Its species name alludes to the shape of the leaves which resemble miniature academics' hoods.

== Description ==
Melaleuca cucullata is dense shrub with arching branches. It grows to a height of about 4.0 m (10 ft) high. Its leaves are sometimes arranged in alternating pairs (decussate) or sometimes alternately along the stem. They are 1.7–5 mm (0.07–0.2 in) long and 1.2–2.6 mm (0.05–0.1 in) wide and thick, fleshy and dished.

This species flowers profusely with heads of flowers at the ends of branches which continue to grow after flowering. The heads contain between 4 and 10 groups of flowers in threes and are about 15–18 mm (0.6–0.7 in) long and 15 mm (0.6 in) in diameter. The petals are 1.3–1.5 mm (0.05–0.06 in) long and fall off as the flower opens. The stamens are pure white, arranged in bundles of five around the flower with 5 to 9 stamens per bundle. The main flowering season is spring and the fruit which follow are woody capsules forming a tight oval shape.

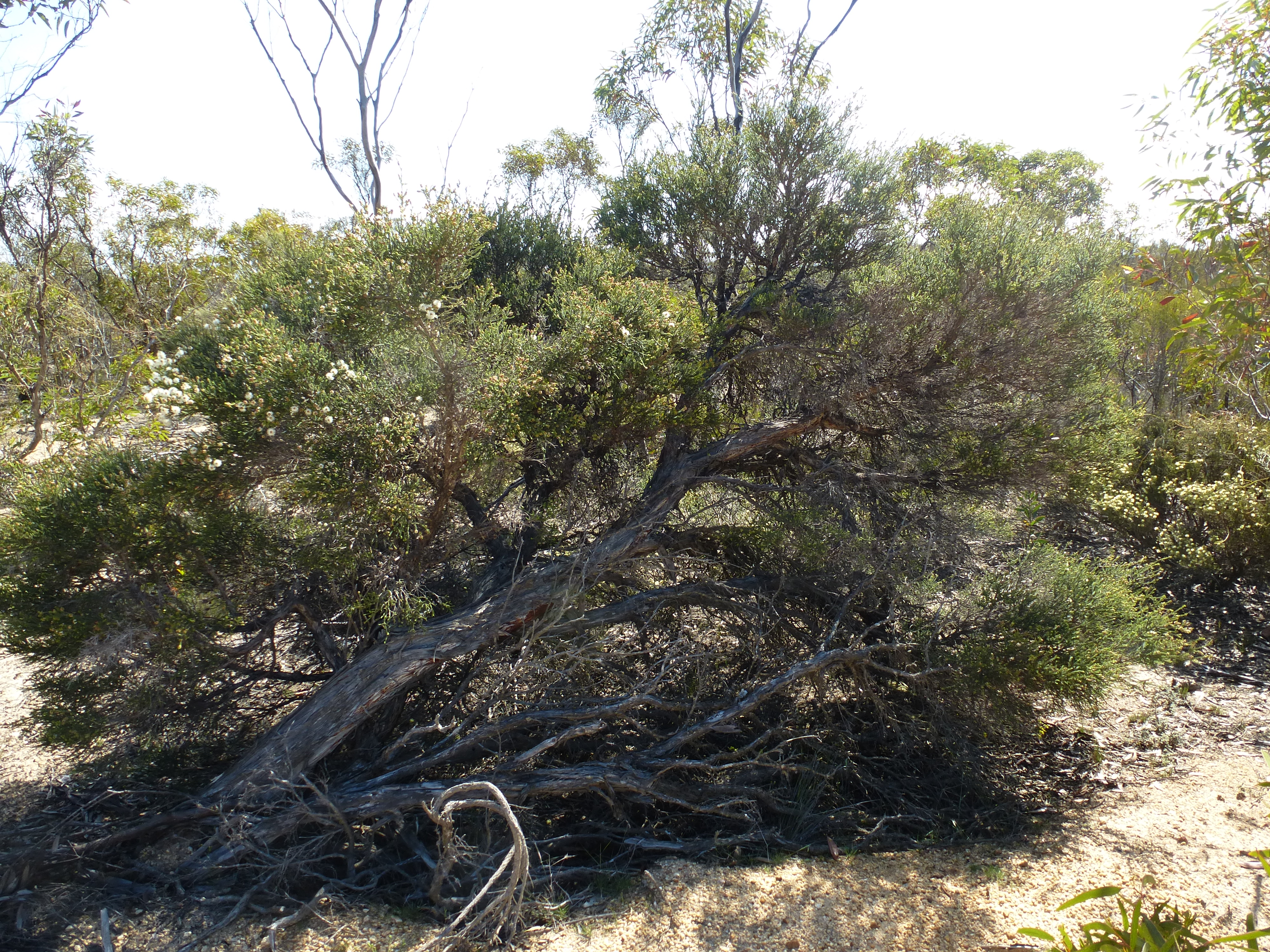
Habit near Ravensthorpe

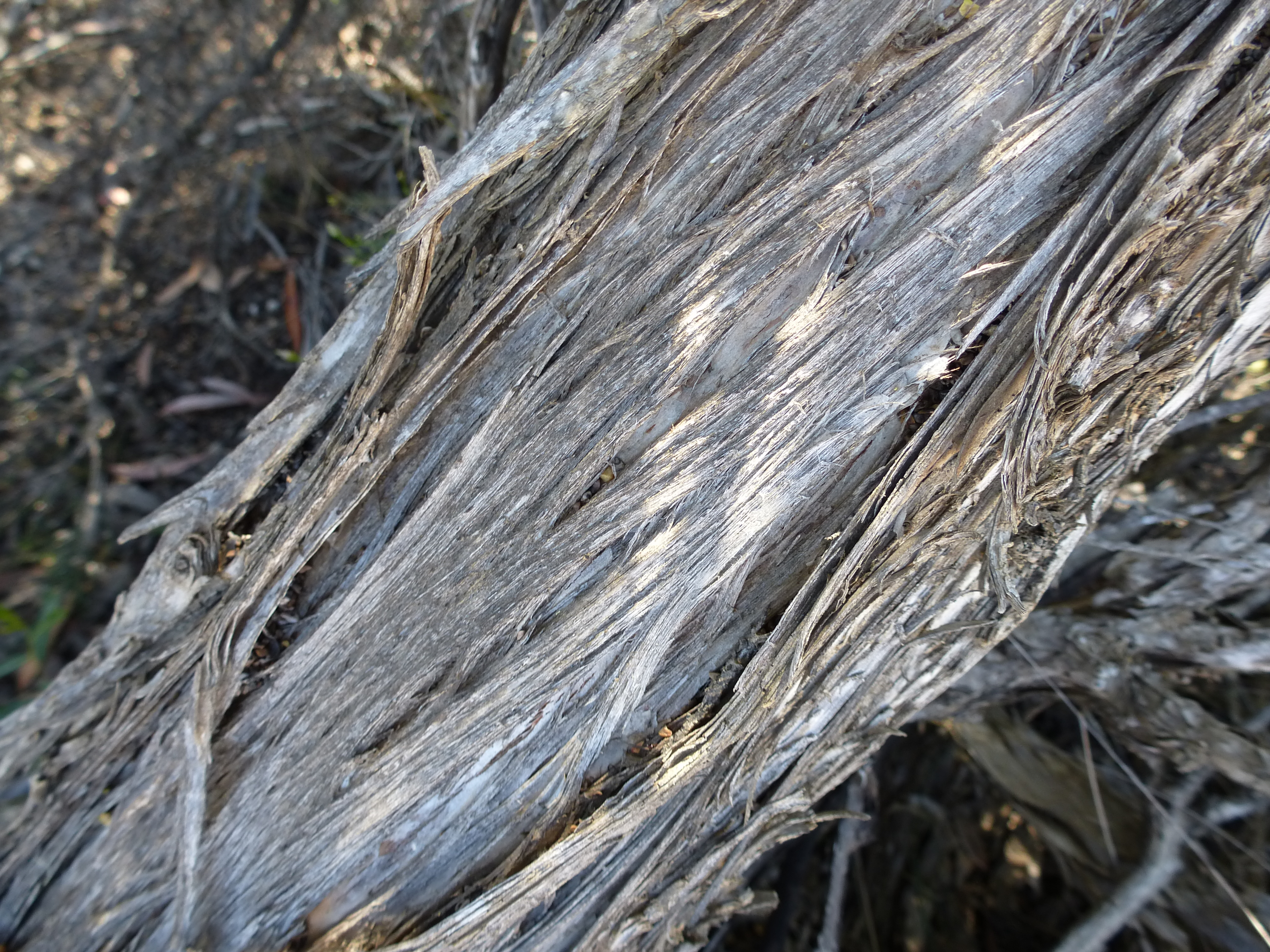
Bark

== Taxonomy and naming ==
This species was first formally described in 1852 by the Russian botanist Nikolai Turczaninow in Bulletin de la Classe physico-mathématique de l'Académie impériale des sciences de Saint-Pétersbourg. The specific epithet (cucullata) is from the Latin cucullus meaning "hood", referring to the leaves which resemble little hoods.

== Distribution and habitat ==
This melaleuca occurs between the Lake Grace, Stirling Range and Israelite Bay districts in the Coolgardie, Esperance Plains and Mallee biogeographic regions. It grows on clay soils and loam on hillsides and flats.

== Conservation status ==
Melaleuca cucullata is listed as not threatened by the Government of Western Australia Department of Parks and Wildlife.
