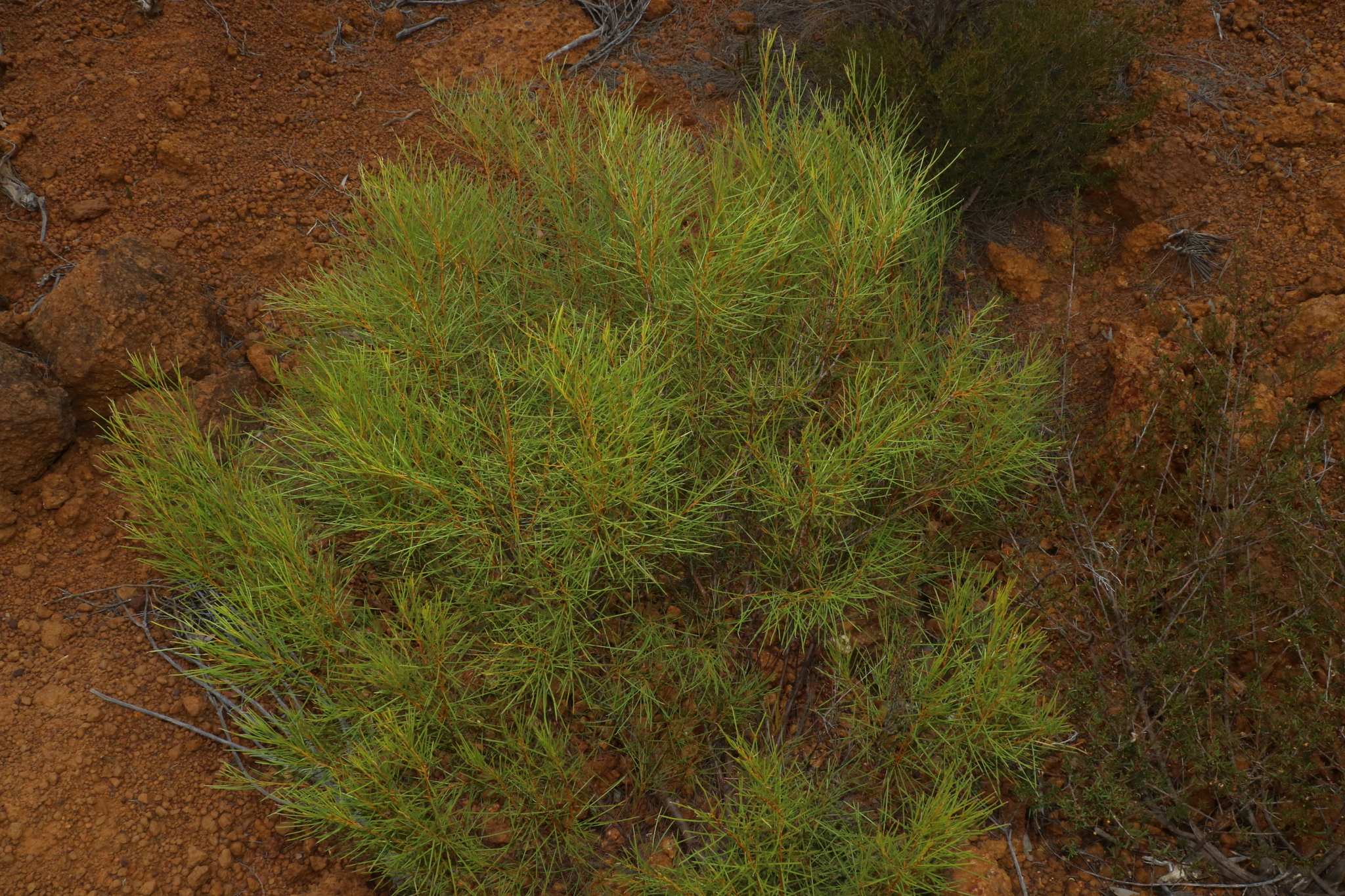

Scientific classification
- Kingdom: Plantae
- Clade: Tracheophytes
- Clade: Angiosperms
- Clade: Eudicots
- Clade: Rosids
- Order: Fabales
- Family: Fabaceae
- Subfamily: Caesalpinioideae
- Clade: Mimosoid clade
- Genus: Acacia
- Species: A. triptycha

Binomial name
- Acacia triptycha F.Muell. ex. Benth.
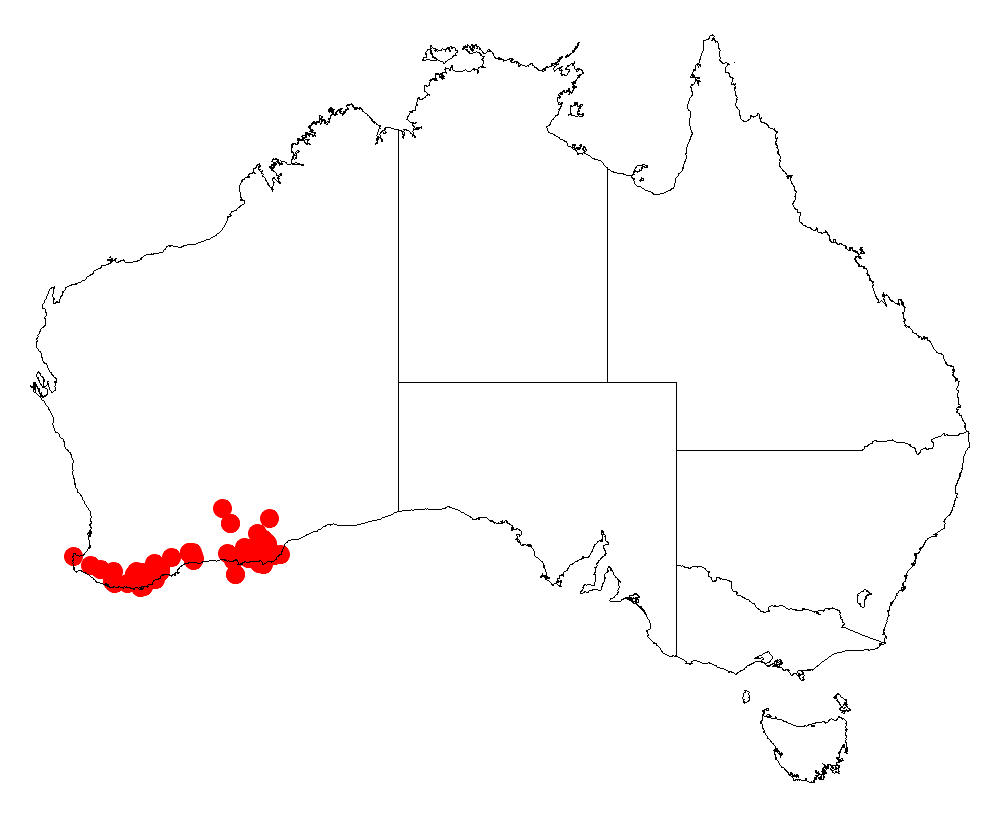
- Occurrence data from AVH

= Acacia triptycha =

Species of legume

Acacia triptycha is a shrub or tree of the genus Acacia and the subgenus Plurinerves that is endemic to an area of south western Australia.

== Description ==
The bushy shrub or tree typically grows to a height of 0.6 to 4 metres (2 to 13 ft) and has glabrous branchlets with hairy golden coloured new growth. Like most species it has phyllodes rather than true leaves. The ascending to erect, glabrous and evergreen phyllodes have a linear threadlike shape and are straight or usually slightly curved with a length of 3 to 13 cm (1.2 to 5.1 in) and a width of 1 to 2 mm (0.039 to 0.079 in) and have eight nerves in total. It blooms from June to January and produces yellow flowers.

== Taxonomy ==
The species was first formally described by the botanist George Bentham in 1864 as a part of the work Flora Australiensis. It was reclassified by Leslie Pedley in 2003 as Racosperma triptychum then transferred back to genus Acacia in 2006.

== Distribution ==
It is native to an area along the south coast in the South West, Great Southern and Goldfields-Esperance regions of Western Australia where it is commonly situated among granite outcrops and on hills and rises growing in gravelly clay or sand or sandy soils with laterite or quartzite or granite. The range of the plant extends from around Busselton in the west then scattered along the south coast with the bulk of the population found between Mount Frankland out to Cape Arid National Park in the east.

== See also ==
- List of Acacia species
