= Kalaako =

Indigenous people of Western Australia

The Kalaako (Kalarko) were an Aboriginal Australian people of the Goldfields-Esperance region of Western Australia.

== Country ==
Norman Tindale assigned the Kalaako tribe a reach extending over 24,000 square miles (62,000 km^{2}), running up north from Green Patch and Scaddan to beyond Widgiemooltha. It takes in Mount Monger, Golden Ridge, and Burbanks. Their eastern boundary lies some 15 miles (24 km) west of Fraser Range, at a site mined for red ochre, known in the native language as Karkanja. Their western frontier is around the Bremer Range. The Johnston Lakes, Mount Holland, Barker Lake, Koongornin, Norseman and Salmon Gums all lie on what is Kalaako territory.

The tribes neighbouring the Kalaako are, clockwise from the north, the Maduwongga, the Tjeraridjal (n.e.), the Ngadjunmaia, the Njunga due south; the Wudjari, the Njakinjaki, and the Kalamaia to the northeast.

== Alternative names ==
- Kalarko
- Malba (Wudjari exonym, meaning they were circumcised and subincised)

Source: Tindale 1974, p. 243

== Sources ==
- "AIATSIS map of Indigenous Australia". AIATSIS. 14 May 2024.
- "Tindale Tribal Boundaries" (PDF). Department of Aboriginal Affairs, Western Australia. September 2016. Archived from the original (PDF) on 8 March 2016.
- Tindale, Norman Barnett (1974). "Kalaako (WA)". Aboriginal Tribes of Australia: Their Terrain, Environmental Controls, Distribution, Limits, and Proper Names. Australian National University. ISBN 978-0-708-10741-6. Archived from the original on 20 March 2020.
