= Acacia pritzeliana =

Scientific classification
- Kingdom: Plantae
- Clade: Tracheophytes
- Clade: Angiosperms
- Clade: Eudicots
- Clade: Rosids
- Order: Fabales
- Family: Fabaceae
- Subfamily: Caesalpinioideae
- Clade: Mimosoid clade
- Genus: Acacia
- Species: A. pritzeliana

Binomial name
- Acacia pritzeliana C.A.Gardner
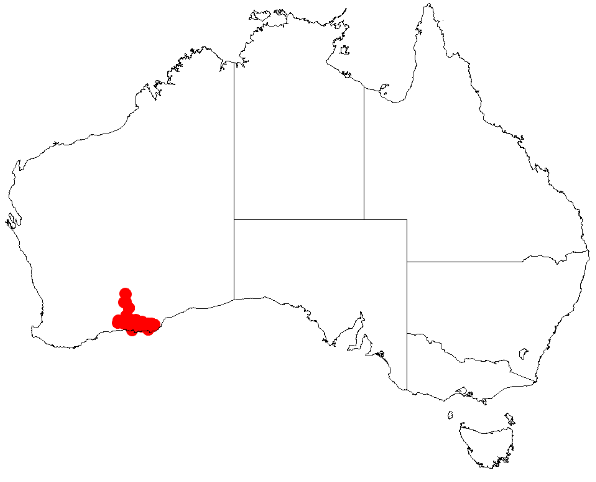
- Occurrence data from AVH

Species of legume

Acacia pritzeliana is a shrub of the genus Acacia and the subgenus Phyllodineae that is endemic to south western Australia.

== Description ==
The open shrub typically grows to a height of 0.2 to 0.9 metres (0.7 to 3.0 ft). It has light grey and scarred branches and hairy branchlets with spinose stipules that have a length of around 2 mm (0.079 in). Like most species of Acacia it has phyllodes rather than true leaves. The crowded, rigid, pungent and evergreen phyllodes have a length of 4 to 10 mm (0.16 to 0.39 in) and a width of 1 to 2 mm (0.039 to 0.079 in) and are usually narrower near the apex with nerves that are rarely evident. It blooms from April to June and produces yellow flowers.

== Distribution ==
It is native to an area in the Goldfields-Esperance region of Western Australia from south of Coolgardie in the north down to around Esperance in the south where it is commonly situated on flats and plains growing in sandy, clay or loamy soils. The distribution of the shrub extends as far as Cape Arid National Park in the east. It is mostly found as a part of Eucalyptus woodland or open shrubland communities.

== See also ==
- List of Acacia species
