= Tjeraridjal =

Indigenous people of Western Australia

The Tjeraridjal are an indigenous people of the Goldfields-Esperance region of Western Australia. Horton treats them as synonymous with the Nyanganyatjara, or it may be that they speak the same dialect of the Western Desert Language.

== Country ==
Tjeraridjal lands, according to Norman Tindale, covered some 14,700 square miles (38,000 km^{2}). At Munuruna/Queen Victoria Spring. Their western borders lay around Kurnalpi and the areas of Lake Yindarlgooda, Piniin, and Karonie. To the east, it extended to the vicinity of Naretha on the margins of the Nullarbor Plain. In native terms, their northeastern limits were designated as being at Kapi Kirkela and Tjikarunja.

Of the ecological transition on the eastern boundary Tindale writes:

the eastern boundary of the Tjeraridjal, near Naretha, is strongly emphasized by the change from sclerophyll forests of mallee and gimlet to myall and bulloak which mark the transition to the vast karst treeless plateau of the Nullarbor Plain.

== Sources ==
- "A17:Nangadadjara/Nyanganyatjara". AIATSIS.
- "A7:Tjeraridjal". AIATSIS.
- Serventy, Vincent (1961). Great Victoria Desert. Vol. 14. San Francisco: Pacific Discovery. pp. 2–11.
- Tindale, Norman Barnett (1974). "Tjeraridjal (WA)". Aboriginal Tribes of Australia: Their Terrain, Environmental Controls, Distribution, Limits, and Proper Names. Australian National University Press. ISBN 978-0-708-10741-6. Archived from the original on 20 March 2020.
