= Ngadjumaya =

Indigenous people of Western Australia

The Ngadju or Ngadjumaya are an Aboriginal Australian people of the Goldfields-Esperance region of Western Australia.

== Country ==
Ngadju traditional land took in some 20,600 square miles (53,000 km^{2}), running south from Goddard Creek to Mount Ragged, Israelite Bay and Point Malcolm. The last named area was land they claim in contention with the Nyunga branch of the Wudjari. Their western borders were around Fraser Range. The eastern frontier was in the vicinity of Narethal and Point Culver. Mount Andrew and Balladonia were also part of Ngadju territory.

In 2014 and 2017 the Federal Court recognized Ngadju traditional ownership of over 102,000 square kilometres, after a long legal proceeding which began in 1995. The land includes exclusive native title over approximately 45,000 square kilometres, east and west of the town of Norseman.

In 2020 the Ngadju Indigenous Protected Area was dedicated on Ngadju land. The Ngadju serve as traditional custodians of the area, which covers 43,993.01 km^{2}, about a quarter of the Great Western Woodlands.

The Ngadju Rangers combine traditional land management and contemporary science to conserve biodiversity, manage fire, weeds, and feral animals, and protect cultural sites within the protected area.

== Curiosity ==
Richard Helms, in his account of the Elders Expedition, writes of a case of polydactyly he came across among a people of this region:

A remarkable lusus naturae was observed among the women of the Frazer Range, one of whom had six perfect fingers on each hand and the same number of toes on each foot. Not only were these limbs perfectly formed, but the corresponding metacarpal and metatarsal bones were also perfect. Two of her brothers and a sister had, I was told, exactly the same deformity.

Norman Tindale identified the tribe here as the Ngadjunmaia.

== Alternative names ==
- Ngadjunpakara, Ngadjunpukara
- Ngadjunma
- Ngadju (nadan is their word for 'yes')
- Ba:donjunga (a Wudjari exonym referring to subincised men)
- Bardok ('subincised')
- Pardoak (Wiilman exonym)
- Ngadjumaja (of Njunga tribe to south)
- Malba (southern tribal name, meaning 'the circumcised') for their language, and also those of the Kalaako and Kalamaia
- Fraser Range tribe
- Minninng
- West Meening, West Mining
- Buljigu (name of a dialect spoken by northern bands)

== Sources ==
- "AIATSIS map of Indigenous Australia". AIATSIS. 14 May 2024.
- "Tindale Tribal Boundaries" (PDF). Department of Aboriginal Affairs, Western Australia. September 2016. Archived from the original (PDF) on 8 March 2016.
- Helms, Richard (1893). "Anthropology of the Elder Exploring Expedition. 1871-1872". Transactions of the Royal Society of South Australia. 16: 237–332.
- Tindale, Norman Barnett (1974). "Ngadjunmaia (WA)". Aboriginal Tribes of Australia: Their Terrain, Environmental Controls, Distribution, Limits, and Proper Names. Australian National University. ISBN 978-0-708-10741-6. Archived from the original on 20 March 2020.
- Wells, Lawrence Allen (1893). Journal of the Elder Scientific Expedition, 1891-1892. Adelaide: C.E. Bristow.
