= Njunga =

Indigenous people of Western Australia

The Njunga or Nyunga are an indigenous Noongar people of Western Australia.

== Name ==
Njunga/nyunga reflects a root (njoŋa/njuŋa/njuŋar) that signifies 'man'. They adopted the term, perhaps defensively, in response to a number of tribes who scorned people who refused to undergo circumcision.

== Country ==
Njunga traditional lands encompassed some 5,100 square miles (13,000 km^{2}), running along and about 30 miles inland of the Southern coastal area of Western Australia. The coastal line ran from Young River east to Israelite Bay. One point of intertribal dispute between the Njunga and their Ngadjunmaia neighbours lay over the area between Point Malcolm and a place called 'Ka:pkidjakidj, somewhere around the northern end of Israelite Bay. Both claimed this as their tribal land.

== History ==
The Njunga once, before contact with whites, formed part of the Wudjari people, but split off over the issue of whether or not to adopt the rite of circumcision, which was being forcefully advocated by the Ngadjunmaia. The Njunga were those Wudjari who decided to import circumcision, though they stopped short of adopting the ancillary measure of subincision. Over time, they Njunga came to consider themselves distinct from their Wudjari kin, and, when asked by ethnographers, both the Wudjari and Njunga insisted that they had become separate tribal realities.

The Njunga eventually relocated to New Norcia where Bishop Rosendo Salvado had taken them. Salvado had taken out British citizenship in order to have the right to defend Aboriginal people in courts, where they were often charged with killing sheep and other livestock. Catholic doctrine, as enunciated by St Thomas Aquinas, does not consider taking out of necessity from others their property as theft, particularly since shepherds drove away the kangaroo on which natives depended.

A number of people descended from these Njunga now live at Goomalling.

== Sources ==
- "AIATSIS map of Indigenous Australia". AIATSIS.
- "Tindale Tribal Boundaries" (PDF). Department of Aboriginal Affairs, Western Australia. September 2016. Archived from the original (PDF) on 8 March 2016.
- O'Sullivan, Dominic (2005). Faith, Politics and Reconciliation: Catholicism and the Politics of Indigeneity. Huia Publishers. ISBN 9781-869-69151-6.
- Tindale, Norman Barnett (1974). "Njunga (WA)". Aboriginal Tribes of Australia: Their Terrain, Environmental Controls, Distribution, Limits, and Proper Names. Australian National University. ISBN 978-0-708-10741-6. Archived from the original on 20 March 2020.
