= Wudjari =

Indigenous people of Western Australia

The Wudjari are an Aboriginal Australian people of the Noongar cultural group of the southern region of Western Australia.

== Country ==
The Wudjari's traditional lands are estimated to have extended over some 6,900 square miles (18,000 km^{2}), encompassing the southern coastal area from the Gairdner River eastwards, as far as Point Malcolm. The inland extension was to about 30 miles (48 km). Kent, Ravensthorpe, Fanny Cove, Esperance, and Cape Arid all have been developed over the old Wudjari lands.

== Early history ==
There was a western/eastern divide among the Wudjari bands. At the earliest point of contact with white explorers, it was noted that the western divisions were on the move, shifting towards Bremer Bay. The groups to the east of Fanny Cove and the Young River, on the other hand, had adopted circumcision as part of their tribal initiatory rites, a transformation that earned them the name of Bardonjunga/Bardok among those Wudjari who refused to absorb the practice. This customary scission, according to Norman Tindale, perhaps marked the inchoate genesis of a new tribal identity among the easterners, who had also adopted a differential ethnonym for themselves, Nyunga. (Note: The autonym means "man" an assertive self-definition to defend themselves against charges by neighbouring circumcising tribes (for example the Ngadjunmaia called them derisively "women") that they were less than men. (Tindale 1974, p. 41)) These Wudjari Njunga contested the terrain between Mount Ragged and Israelite Bay (Note: The name aptly demarcates the cultural border between the circumcising and non-circumcising tribes of the area. (Tindale 1974, p. 41)) with the Ngadjunmaia.

== Curiosity ==
In 1855 an edited account was published of a shipwrecked castaway, called William Jackman, purporting to relate 18 months of captivity among Australian cannibal tribes somewhere on the Great Australian Bight. The story proved very popular, and the narrative seen as fascinating, but suspicions have long existed as to its authenticity. In 2002, the historian Martin Gibbs analysed both the book and its historical background and context, and concluded that some elements certainly bore traces of familiarity with the Nyungar cultural bloc. In particular he conjectured that parts of the tale might well reflect experience of living among the Wudjari, or Nyunga, or even the Ngadjunmaia.

== Alternative names ==
- ?Daran (Perth exonym for eastern tribes seeing the sun emerge from the sea)
- Karkar (Wiiman exonym meaning "east")
- Kwaitjman (of northern tribes)
- Ngokgurring
- Ngokwurring
- Njungar, Nyungar
- Njungura (Mimeng informant's exonym)
- Nonga (Note: nunga = nonga = 'njonga = 'njunga = 'njungar, meaning "man" (Tindale 1974, p. 261))
- Nunga
- Warangu
- Widjara
- Wuda
- Wudja
- Wudjarima
- Yunga/Yungar (tribal name of the Bremer Bay tribe, where a group of Wudjari shifted, into territory not originally theirs)

Source: Tindale 1974, p. 261

== Some words ==
- kooning (baby)
- kun (mother)
- mann (father)
- mookine (wild dog)
- twart (tame dog)

Source: Chester 1886, p. 390

== Sources ==
- "AIATSIS map of Indigenous Australia". AIATSIS. 14 May 2024.
- Chester, George (1886). "Kent District, vocabulary of the Warrangoo tribe". In Curr, Edward Micklethwaite (ed.). The Australian race: its origin, languages, customs, place of landing in Australia and the routes by which it spread itself over the continent (PDF). Vol. 1. Melbourne: J. Ferres. pp. 390–391.
- Gibbs, Martin (2002). "The Enigma of William Jackman, 'The Australian Captive': Fictional account or the true story of a 19th century castaway in Western Australia?". The Great Circle. 24 (2). Australian Association for Maritime History: 3–21. JSTOR 41563113.
- Jackman, William (1855). Chamberlayne, Reverend I. (ed.). The Australian Captive; or, An Authentic Narrative of fifteen the Life of William Jackman in which, among other adventures, is included a forced of a year and a half among the cannibals of Nuyťs Land, on the coast of the Great Bight (PDF). Auburn: Derby and Miller.
- "Tindale Tribal Boundaries" (PDF). Department of Aboriginal Affairs, Western Australia. September 2016. Archived from the original (PDF) on 8 March 2016.
- Tindale, Norman Barnett (1974). "Wudjari (WA)". Aboriginal Tribes of Australia: Their Terrain, Environmental Controls, Distribution, Limits, and Proper Names. Australian National University. ISBN 978-0-708-10741-6. Archived from the original on 20 March 2020.
