= Condingup =

Locality in the Shire of Esperance, Western Australia

- Town
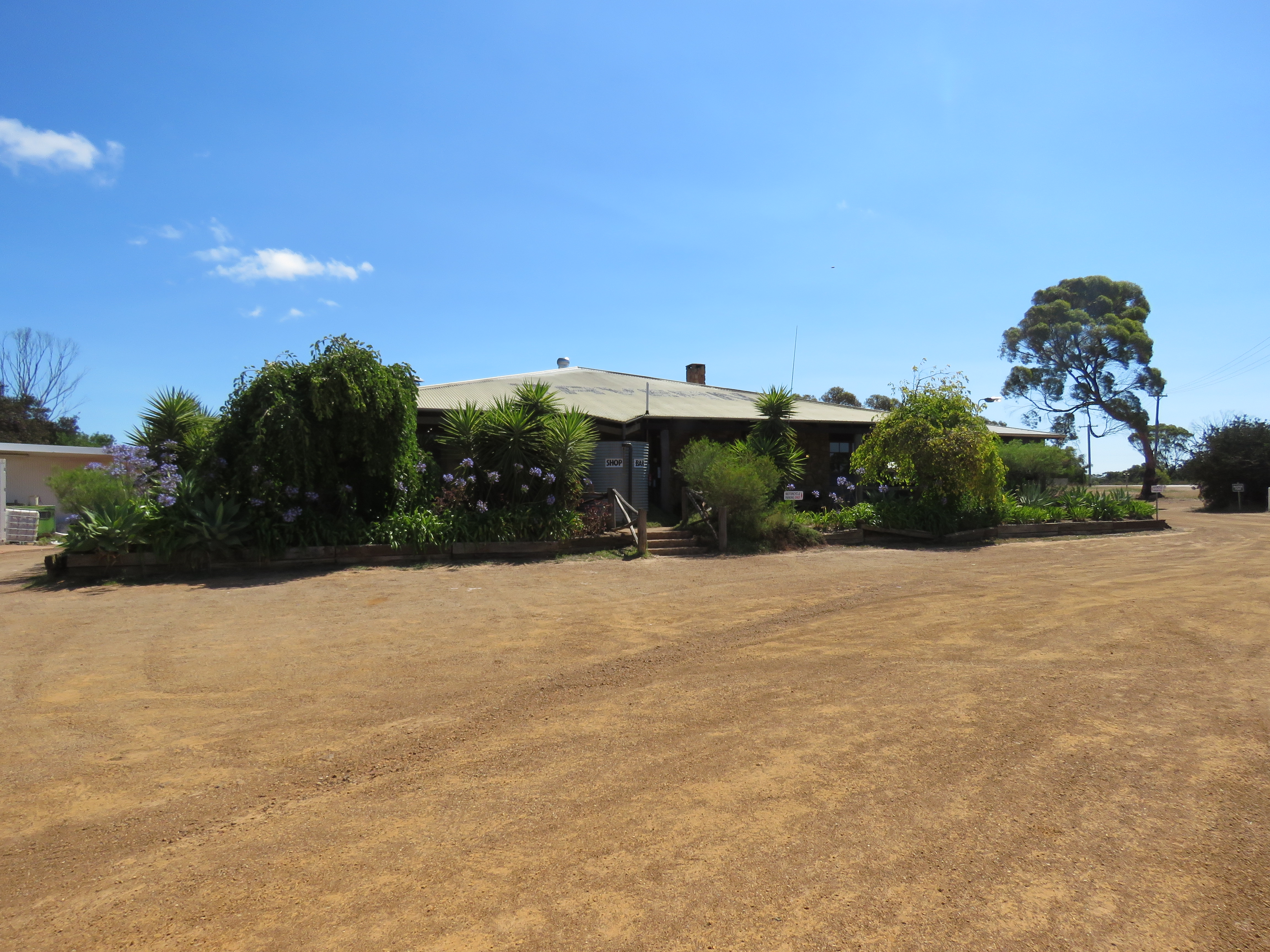
- The Condingup Tavern in January 2024

- Interactive map of Condingup
- Coordinates: 33.76°S 122.53°E
- Country: Australia
- State: Western Australia
- LGA: Shire of Esperance
- Location: 788 km (490 mi) SE of Perth, Western Australia; 68 km (42 mi) E of Esperance
- Established: 1963

Government
  - State electorate: Roe
  - Federal division: O'Connor

Area
  - Total: 1,069.6 km^{2} (413.0 sq mi)

Population
  - Total: 280 (SAL 2021)
- Time zone: WAST (UTC+8)
- Postcode: 6450
Localities around Condingup
Neridup	Mount Ney	Beaumont
Merivale	Condingup	Howick
Cape Le Grand	Cape Le Grand	Southern Ocean

Condingup is a town and locality in the Goldfields–Esperance region of Western Australia, in the Shire of Esperance local government area, 782 kilometres (486 mi) southeast of the state capital, Perth. A small section of the locality is situated on the Southern Ocean, at the Duke of Orleans Bay, while the townsite itself is at the intersection of Fisheries Road and Orleans Bay Road. Condingup borders Cape Le Grand National Park in the south. The Coolinup Nature Reserve is located in the west of Condingup. A second townsite, Wharton, is located in the south of Condingup, on the shore of the Duke of Orleans Bay.

At the 2016 census, it and the surrounding region had a population of 278.

Condingup was declared a townsite on 3 May 1963. Its name is thought to be derived from the Aboriginal word Kunjinup, a local wildflower. Local industries includes cattle, sheep and grain production.

From the 1950s to the 1970s a range of celebrities owned property in the area including Art Linkletter, Anne Baxter and Rhonda Fleming. Linkletter helped the town establish its first school, school bus and shop.

The Coolinup Nature Reserve was gazetted on 18 December 1964, has a size of 2.16 square kilometres (0.83 mi^{2}) and is located in the Esperance Plains bioregion.
