= Israelite Bay =

- Interactive map of Israelite Bay
- Coordinates: 33.61°S 123.876°E
- Country: Australia
- State: Western Australia
- LGA: Shire of Esperance

Government
  - State electorate: Roe
  - Federal division: O'Connor

Area
  - Total: 2,098.5 km^{2} (810.2 sq mi)

Population
  - Total: 0 (SAL 2016)
- Postcode: 6452
Localities around Israelite Bay
Buraminya	Buraminya	Balladonia
Cape Arid	Israelite Bay	Southern Ocean
	Southern Ocean

Israelite Bay is a bay and locality of the Shire of Esperance in the Goldfields-Esperance region of Western Australia, located along the Southern Ocean. Except for a small strip in the north-west of the locality, Israelite Bay is completely taken up by the Nuytsland Nature Reserve. The first European explorers of the area were Charles Dempster and his brother Andrew, who observed that the local Ngadju people practiced circumcision while the Noongar people to their west did not, thus marking a boundary between the two tribes and naming the area Israelite Bay after the Jewish tradition of circumcision.

Israelite Bay lies east of Esperance and the Cape Arid National Park, within the Nuytsland Nature Reserve and the Great Australian Bight. Point Malcolm is about 25 kilometres (16 mi) west of Israelite Bay, and there is a long sandy beach there.

Climate data was recorded at Israelite Bay from 1885 to 1927, and it is frequently mentioned in Bureau of Meteorology weather reports as a geographical marker.

It was the site of a significant telegraph station in the early 1900s. It was also a location serviced by the state government's State Steamship Service, the South Coast Service, in the early 1900s.

The Eastern Group, the eastern-most islands of the Recherche Archipelago, identified by Matthew Flinders in January 1802, is offshore of Israelite Bay.
