= Cape Arid National Park =

National park of Western Australia

- IUCN category II (national park)
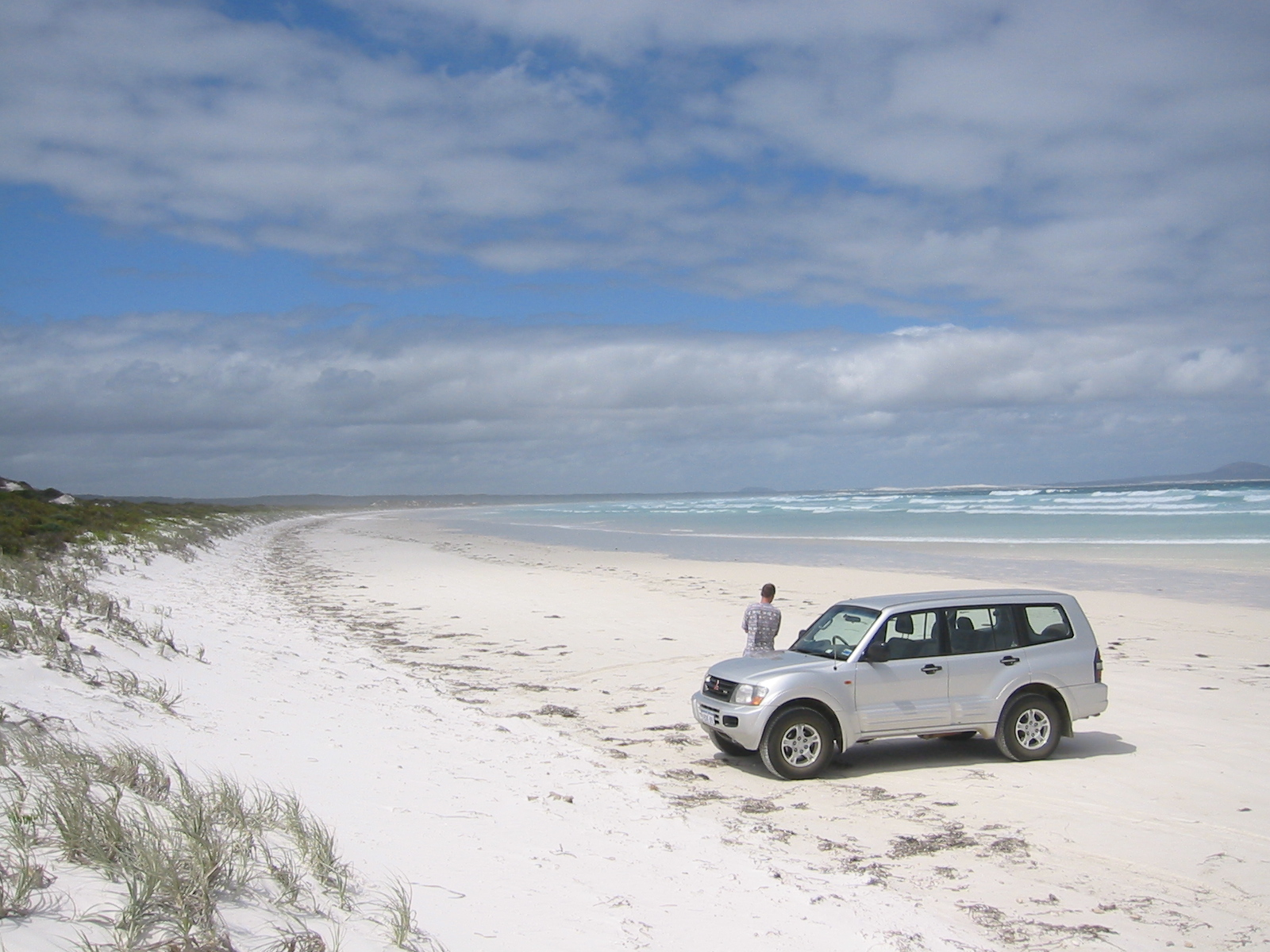
- Yokinup Bay, Cape Arid

- Location within Western Australia
- Location: Western Australia
- Coordinates: 33°42′14″S 123°22′10″E
- Area: 2,794.46 km^{2} (1,078.95 sq mi)
- Established: 1969
- Governing body: Department of Environment and Conservation

Cape Arid National Park is a national park located in Western Australia, 731 kilometres (454 mi) southeast of Perth. The park is situated 120 kilometres (75 mi) east of Esperance and lies on the shore of the south coast from the eastern end of the Recherche Archipelago.

The bay at its eastern side is Israelite Bay, a locality often mentioned in Bureau of Meteorology weather reports as a geographical marker. The western end is known as Duke of Orleans Bay. Its coastline is defined by Cape Arid, a bay called Sandy Bight and, further east, Cape Pasley.

The locality of Cape Arid of the Shire of Esperance shares almost identical boundaries with the national park, the exception being a number of roads passing through the park and locality which are part of the latter but not the former.

== History ==
The first European to discover the area was the French Admiral Bruni D'Entrecasteaux in 1792 and he named it Cap Aride; Matthew Flinders anglicized the name in 1802 and the park took its name from this feature.

Pioneer graziers arrived in the area in the 1870s and the ruins of homesteads, dams and buildings as well as gravesites can be found near Pine Hill and Thomas Fishery.

Bay whaling was conducted by Thomas Sherratt at Barrier Anchorage in the 1870s. John Thomas also seems to have had a bay whaling operation in the 1860s at Thomas's Fishery.

As a result of the 2015 Esperance bushfires up to 90% of the remaining Western Ground Parrot habitat within the park was burned. Much of the habitat had already been burned by a bushfire in Cape Arid National Park during October of the same year. Prior to the fires, there were believed to be only 140 individual parrots living in the wild, and the number was estimated to have been reduced to only 30–40 as a result of the damage caused by the fires. The widespread destruction of dense vegetation the ground-dwelling birds rely on for nesting prompted discussion that the critically endangered parrot could "... become the first bird in at least 200 years to become extinct in Western Australia". Two parrots—a male and a female—were rescued from the Cape Arid fire ground and taken to Perth Zoo for inclusion in a captive breeding program, however both birds died in captivity.

== Environment ==
=== Geography ===
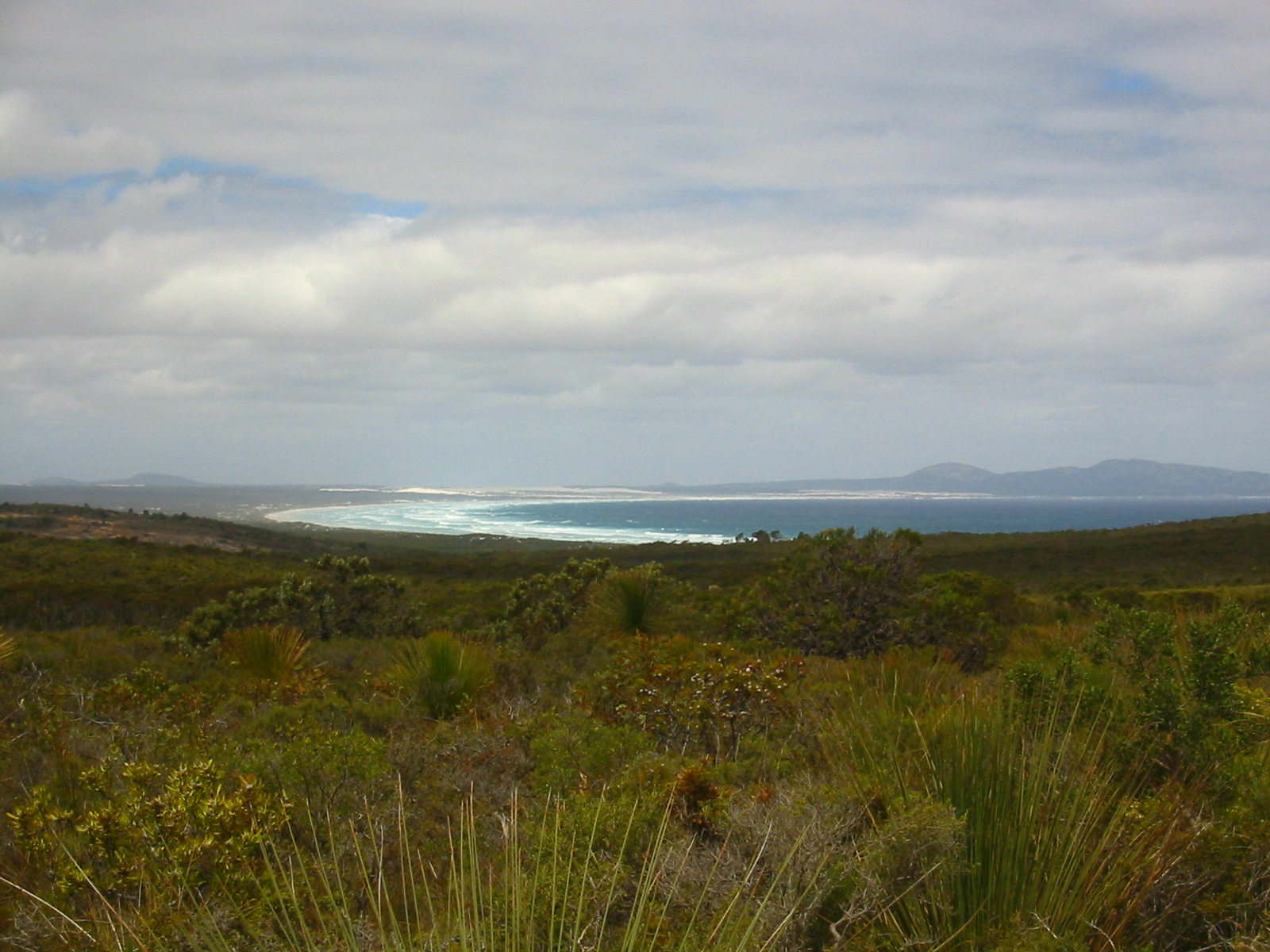
Tagon Bay

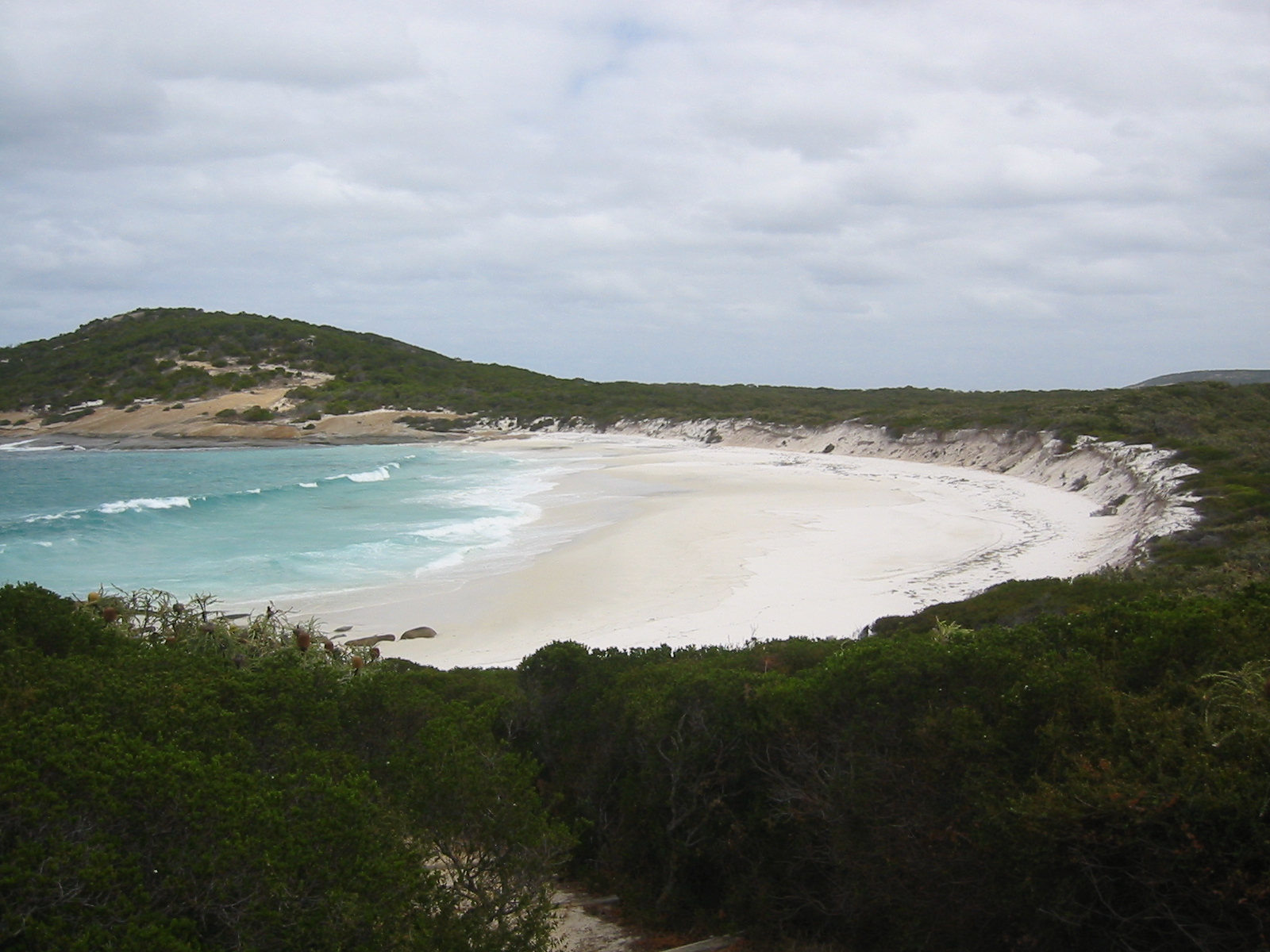
Bay near Tagon Point

The area is composed of sandy beaches and rocky headlands to the south with low granite hills extending to the north to join the jagged Russell Range that is primarily composed of pre-cambrian quartzite. The highest point of the park is Tower Peak, located within the Range, which reaches a height of 594 metres (1,949 ft). Sand-plains that are rich in flora surround the hill areas.

The eastern boundary of the park joins the western side of Nuytsland Nature Reserve. Ngadju Indigenous Protected Area adjoins the park on the north.

=== Fauna ===
A wide variety of habitat exists within the park which supports a wide variety of flora and fauna. The park is an important site for the bird life in Western Australia. It is home to over 160 species of birds including some that are endangered and restricted. Some of the birds found in the park include: the western ground parrot, the Australasian bittern, Carnaby's cockatoo and Cape Barren geese.

Fauna that can be found include the western brush wallaby, quenda, the southern bush rat, many small marsupial predators and a variety of reptiles and amphibians.

A rare and primitive species of ant of the genus Nothomyrmecia is thought to inhabit the area.

=== Flora ===
Vegetation found within the park is mostly on young dune systems that have large communities of coastal heath with smaller systems of yate, banksia, paperbark and mallee. Species of orchid and ferns exist near Mount Ragged including a small population of the sticky-tail flower (Anthocersis viscosa).

=== Trails ===
Many walk trails can be found in the park, including the Len Otte Nature Trail, Tagon Coastal Trail, Boolenup Walk Trail and walks up both Mount Ragged and Mount Arid. The most accessible campsite is at Thomas River with conventional drive access, barbecues, toilets and water tanks. Other campsites at Mount Ragged, Poison Creek and Deal Creek are only accessible by four-wheel drive vehicles.

== See also ==
- Protected areas of Western Australia
