= Kundip, Western Australia =

Former town in the Shire of Ravensthorpe, Western Australia

Kundip
- Town
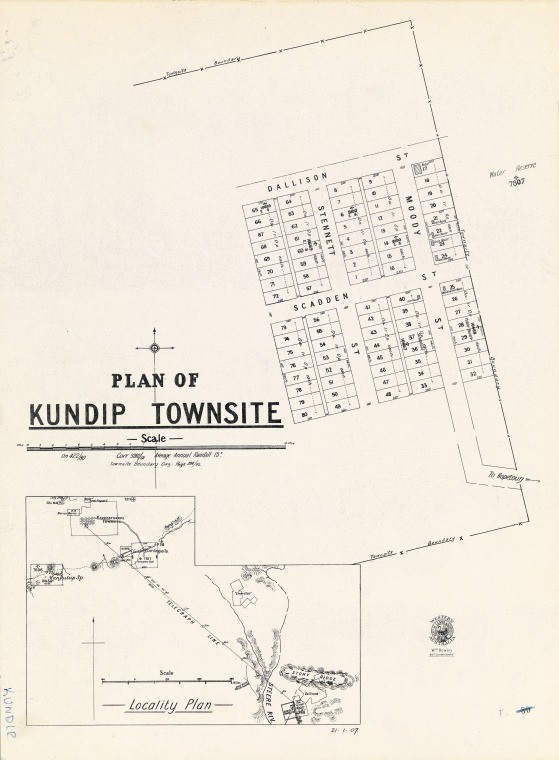
- A 1907 map of the townsite of Kundip

- Interactive map of Kundip
- Coordinates: 33.68902°S 120.18570°E
- Country: Australia
- State: Western Australia
- LGA: Shire of Ravensthorpe
- Location: 448 km (278 mi) SE of Perth; 30 km (19 mi) N of Hopetoun; 17 km (11 mi) SE of Ravensthorpe
- Established: 1902

Government
  - State electorate: Roe
  - Federal division: O'Connor

Area
  - Total: 1.04 km^{2} (0.40 sq mi)
- Postcode: 6346

Kundip is an abandoned mining town of the Shire of Ravensthorpe in the Goldfields-Esperance region of Western Australia. It is located within the locality of Ravensthorpe, on the Hopetoun to Ravensthorpe Road.

== History ==
Kundip is located on the traditional land of the Wudjari people of the Noongar nation.

The townsite of Kundip was gazetted in 1902, after gold and copper was discovered in this area in 1899. The name Harbour View, after a local mine, was considered, but Coondip was chosen instead in 1901; the spelling was changed to Kundip when it was gazetted. By the 1950s, the town had been abandoned and all buildings removed. The town experienced some ups and downs during its time of existence. In its early peak, before the First World War, it had over 40 houses but, by the 1920s, with mining in the area in decline, only a few families were left in town. The town experienced a resurgence in the 1930s, when Claude de Bernales invested into mining in the area. The start of the Second World War caused a manpower shortage, and the town declined once more, this time never to recover.

An official 1907 map of the townsite shows it consisting of the north-south running Moody and Stennett Streets and the east-west running Dallison and Scadden Streets, with 80 blocks of land allocated along them. The town's hotel was shown in the north-eastern-most block.

The Kundip Townsite, Kundip Half Way House, Kundip School Site and the Hopetoun Hall, formerly the Kundip Hall, are listed on the shire's heritage register.

The Kundip Hall was located in Kundip from 1906 before being relocated to Hopetoun in the late 1940s. The Kundip school experienced a similar fate, opening in 1906 and being moved from the town in 1932 to Mount Madden, where it remains to this day.

Kundip was a stop on the Hopetoun to Ravensthorpe railway line, which operated from 1909 to 1946.

== Mining ==
Kundip's history is heavily influenced by mining in the area.

The Harbour View mine is so called because the Southern Ocean at Mary Ann Harbour could be seen from the mine. Gold and copper were mined at Harbour View from 1900 to 1941, but operations in this time were not continuous, with the mine being idle at times.

Another mine active in the Kundip area, east of the townsite, was the Mount Iron mine. Despite its name, the mine has no connection to iron ore mining. Instead, gold mineralisation at the site was found in ironstone.

== Nature reserve ==
The Kundip Nature reserve is located just south of the townsite. It was gazetted on 24 December 1971, has a size of 21.7 square kilometres (8.4 mi^{2}), and is located in the Esperance Plains bioregion.
