= List of heritage places in the Shire of Ravensthorpe =

List of heritage sites in Western Australia

The State Register of Heritage Places is maintained by the Heritage Council of Western Australia. As of 2026, 122 places are heritage-listed in the Shire of Ravensthorpe, of which one is on the State Register of Heritage Places, the Metropolitan Hotel in Hopetoun.

== List ==
=== State Register of Heritage Places ===
The Western Australian State Register of Heritage Places, as of 2026, lists the following state registered place within the Shire of Ravensthorpe:

Place name	Place #	Street number	Street name	Suburb or town	Co-ordinates	Built	State registered	Notes & former names	Photo
Metropolitan Hotel	2312	26	Veal Street	Hopetoun	33.949553°S 120.126769°E	1901 (East wing) 1907 (Front section)	20 February 2004	Starboard Cafe & Nautilus Restaurant	

=== Shire of Ravensthorpe heritage-listed places ===
The following places are heritage listed in the Shire of Ravensthorpe but are not State registered:

Place name	Place #	Street #	Street name	Suburb or town	Notes & former names	Photo
St Andrew's Church	2306	23	Dunn Street	Ravensthorpe		
Goldfields Club (former)	2307	66-68	Morgans Street	Ravensthorpe	Palace Hotel	
WA Bank & Quarters (former)	2308	65	Morgans Street	Ravensthorpe	Council Chambers, Ravensthorpe Shire Council Office	
Port Hotel	2309	11	Veal Street	Hopetoun		
FE Daw and Sons Store	2310		Morgans Street	Ravensthorpe	Daw's Store	
Mine Manager's House (former)	2311	97	Carlisle Street	Ravensthorpe	The Big House	
Hopetoun Jetty	2313		Mary Ann Haven Anchorage	Hopetoun	Hopetoun Jetty Ruins	
Masonic Lodge	2314	51	Morgans Street	Ravensthorpe	Commercial Hotel & Brown's Hotel, Ravensthorpe Community Centre	
Dance Cottage	2315	88	Morgans Street	Ravensthorpe	Museum, Hampshire	
Mechanics' Institute (former)	2316	100	Morgans Street	Ravensthorpe	Ravensthorpe Hall	
Cocanarup Homestead Outbuildings and Springs	2317	665	Cocanarup Road	Ravensthorpe		
Old Ravensthorpe Cemetery	3627		Moir Road 3 km (1.9 mi) south of	Ravensthorpe		
Ravensthorpe First Police Station	3735	59-61	Spence Street	Ravensthorpe		
Ravensthorpe Police Horse Paddock	3736	4645	Hopetoun-Ravensthorpe Road	Ravensthorpe		
Warden's House	3737	55-57	Spence Street	Ravensthorpe		
Union Bank (former)	3738	28	Carlisle Street	Ravensthorpe		
Ravensthorpe Old Post & Telegraph Office	3751	56-58	Morgans Street	Ravensthorpe	Ravensthorpe Telecentre	
Springdale Homestead	3948	658	Springdale Road	Jerdacuttup		
Commercial Hotel (former)	4318		Morgans Street	Ravensthorpe	Ravensthorpe Community Centre	
Flat Topped Yate - Swamp Yate	4384		Lake King Road	Ravensthorpe	E. occidentalis, Twin Yates	
Rabbit Proof Fence No 2 and No 3	5022			Northampton to Ravensthorpe	Emu Barrier Fence	
Rabbit Proof Fence No 1	5253			Port Hedland to Ravensthorpe		
The Magazine Copper Mine	6628			Phillips River		
Lansell's Store	9981	80	Morgans Street	Ravensthorpe		
Point Anne Hut	10654			Fitzgerald River National Park		
St Paul's Church	11583		Tubada Street	Munglinup		
Woodenup Pool	13961		Woodenup Creek	Ravensthorpe		
Dunn's Swamp	13962			Hopetoun	Dunn's Lake	
Jerdacuttup Springs	13963		Jerdacuttup River	Jerdacuttup		
Nindilbillup Creek Rockhole	13964			Nindibillup		
Gnamma Hole	13965	Cnr	Fence Road & Hwy One	Jerdacuttup		
Wilga Bank Spring	13966		Oldfield River South of Highway One	Wilga		
Ravensthorpe No.1 Dam	13967			Ravensthorpe		
Cordingup Dam	13968		Cordingup	Cordingup		
Blacksmith's Tree	13969			Ravensthorpe	E. salmonophloia	
Avenue of Old Salmon Gums	13970		Ravensthorpe & Hopetoun Road	Cordingup		
Moreton Bay Fig Tree	13971	Cnr	Morgans & Moir Streets	Ravensthorpe		
Meridian	13972		Highway One	Ravensthorpe	Annabel Creek Rest Area	
Aboriginal Midden	13973		Coxall Road	Munglinup	Aboriginal Camp	
Moolyall Rocks	13974		Moolyall Creek	Moolyall		
East West Telegraph Line and Track	13975			Ravensthorpe		
Dunn's Track	13976			Ravensthorpe	Hewby & May Track	
Mary Ann Harbour to Cocanarup & Carlingup Track	13977		Ravensthorpe-Hopetoun Track	Ravensthorpe		
Old Ongerup Road	13978			Ravensthorpe		
Hopetoun Beacons	13979		Table Hill, Foreshore & Harbour	Hopetoun	Shipping Beacons	
Jerdacuttup Primary School	13980			Jerdacuttup		
North Ravensthorpe Primary School	13981			Ravensthorpe		
Rabbit Proof Fence No 1	13982			Ravensthorpe	State Barrier Fence	
Kundip School Site	13983	Lot 62	Stennet Street	Kundip		
Hopetoun/Ravensthorpe Railway	13984			Ravensthorpe		
Ravensthorpe Railway Station	13985		Jamieson Street & Esperance Road	Ravensthorpe	part of the Hopetoun to Ravensthorpe railway line	
Baseden's Cottage	13996	27	Carlisle Street	Ravensthorpe		
No 2 Government Smelter	13997		Ravensthorpe & Hopetoun Road	Ravensthorpe	Cordingup Smelter	
Dunn's Cottage	13998		Dunn's Swamp	Ravensthorpe		
Hopetoun Hall	13999		Veal Street	Hopetoun	Kundip Hall (former)	
Hopetoun Post Office & Manual Telephone Exchange	14000	25	Veal Street	Hopetoun	Post and Telegraph Office	
Granny Gibson's House	14001			Hopetoun	Original Ravensthorpe Doctors House	
Police Station and Goal	14002	14	Barnett Street	Hopetoun		
Carlingup Homestead and Fresh Water Spring	14008			Carlingup/Getenmellup		
Cordingup Farm House	14010		Hopetoun Road	Cordingup	Elverdton Mine Manager's House	
Reynold's Old House, Kybalup	14011		Moir Road	Ravensthorpe		
Kybulup Barn	14012		Moir Road	Kybulup	Kybutup, Kybalup	
River View Farm	14013		Daniels Road	Hopetoun		
Ravensthorpe Cemetery	14014		Highway One	Ravensthorpe		
John Dunn Grave	14015		Cocanarup Road	Cocanarup		
Ravensthorpe War Memorial & John Dunn & Geordie Memorials	14016	Cnr	Jamieson Street & Hopetoun Road	Ravensthorpe		
Cattlin Gold/Copper Mine	14017		Floater Street	Ravensthorpe	Mount Cattlin	
Elverdton Gold Copper Mine	14018		Ravensthorpe-Hopetoun Road	Ravensthorpe		
Marion Martin Gold/Copper Mine	14019		Morgans Street	Ravensthorpe		
Magnesite Mine	14020		15 miles East of	Bandalup		
Quarry	14021		Moir Road	Ravensthorpe	Spongolite-fossilized sea sponge, Ravensthorpe Freestone	
Hawk's Nest Mining Camp	14022		Hawk's Nest	Ravensthorpe	Central Camp Ravensthorpe	
Kundip Townsite	14023			Kundip	Coondip	
Elverdton/Desmond Townsite	14024			Desmond		
Hatter's Hill Mines and Campsite	14025			Hatter's Hill		
Jim Dunn's Wonder Mine	14026		Annabel Creek	Ravensthorpe		
Harbour View	14027		Ravensthorpe Range	Kundip		
Floater Gold Mine	14028		Floater Road	Ravensthorpe		
Maori Queen (Mining Lease No 1 1899)	14029			Ravensthorpe		
Manganese Mines	14030		Fitzgerald River National Park	Ravensthorpe	Coppermine Creek and Naendip	
Last Venture and Pick & Shovel Mines	14032			Ravensthorpe	West River Mines	
Head's Trial Smelter	14033			Hawk's Nest	Hawk's Nest Camp	
No 1 Smelter	14034		Ravensthorpe-Esperance Road 7 k East of	Ravensthorpe	Gap Smelter	
Wehr Bros Processing Plant	14035	647	Ravensthorpe & Hopetoun Road	Cordingup		
Lighthouses	14037			Hopetoun		
Melrose Farm pt of Fair View Farm	14038		Jerramungup Road 5 k West of	Ravensthorpe		
Old CBH Bins Site	14039	31-35	Dunn Street	Ravensthorpe		
Johnny Horner's Camp	14040		Burlabup Creek	Jerdacuttup		
First Hospital - Ravensthorpe	14041	74	Martin Street	Ravensthorpe		
Hopetoun Warehouse	14043		Veal Street	Hopetoun		
Hopetoun General Store (former)	14044	87	Veal Street	Hopetoun		
Ravensthorpe School	14045		Morgans Street	Ravensthorpe		
Hopetoun School	14046	Lot 459	Canning Street	Hopetoun		
Old School Site	14047		Hatfield Street	Desmond	Elverdton School, Desmond School	
Chambers Farm School	14048		Magpie Farm	Ravensthorpe		
Munglinup Primary School site	14049	Cnr	Highway One & Yandee Street	Munglinup		
Fitzgerald Primary Schools	14050			Fitzgerald		
Jerdacuttup Fish Cannery	14052		Jerdacuttup River	Hopetoun	12 Mile Beach	
Hopetoun Fish Cannery	14053		The Esplanade	Hopetoun		
Baptist Church	14054	75	Spence Street	Ravensthorpe	Interdenominational Mission Church	
Methodist Church	14055	38	Kingsmill Street	Ravensthorpe		
Ravensthorpe Hotel	14056	Lot 84	Morgans Street	Ravensthorpe		
Miner's Arms site	14057	57	Morgans Street	Ravensthorpe	Senior Citizens Hall	
Desmond Hotel site	14058			Desmond		
Kundip Half Way House	14059	Lot 17	Moody Street	Kundip		
Old Brewery	14060	253	Jamieson Street	Ravensthorpe		
Aerated Water Factory	14061	79	Morgans Street	Ravensthorpe		
Old Butter Factory	14062	743	Jamieson Street	Ravensthorpe		
Old Rifle Range	14063		Hopetoun Road	Ravensthorpe		
Old Race Course	14064		Esperance Road	Ravensthorpe		
Wreck sites - Wave, Agnes, Alita, Mary Ann, Kepler, Leata, Croyden, Seaway	14065		Offshore	Ravensthorpe		
Ravensthorpe Fire Station	14636		Dunn Street	Ravensthorpe		
Mount Benson Mine	16705			Phillips River	Extended	
Thistle & Shamrock Mine	16706			Phillips River		
Iron Clad Mine	16709			Phillips River		
Fitzgerald River National Park (1989 Boundary)	16719		2 k North of	Bremer Bay		
Ravensthorpe Police Station & Courthouse	17417		Morgan Street	Ravensthorpe		
Jerdacuttup River Komatiites	18767		6 km (3.7 mi) north-east of Kundip	Kundip		
Hopetoun Old Cemetery	24894		Hopetoun-Ravensthorpe Road	Hopetoun		
Hopetoun Railway Station	24898		The Esplanade	Hopetoun	part of the Hopetoun to Ravensthorpe railway line	
Hopetoun Lightering Jetty	24899		Esplanade	Hopetoun		
