= Desmond, Western Australia =

Former town in the Shire of Ravensthorpe, Western Australia

Desmond
- Town
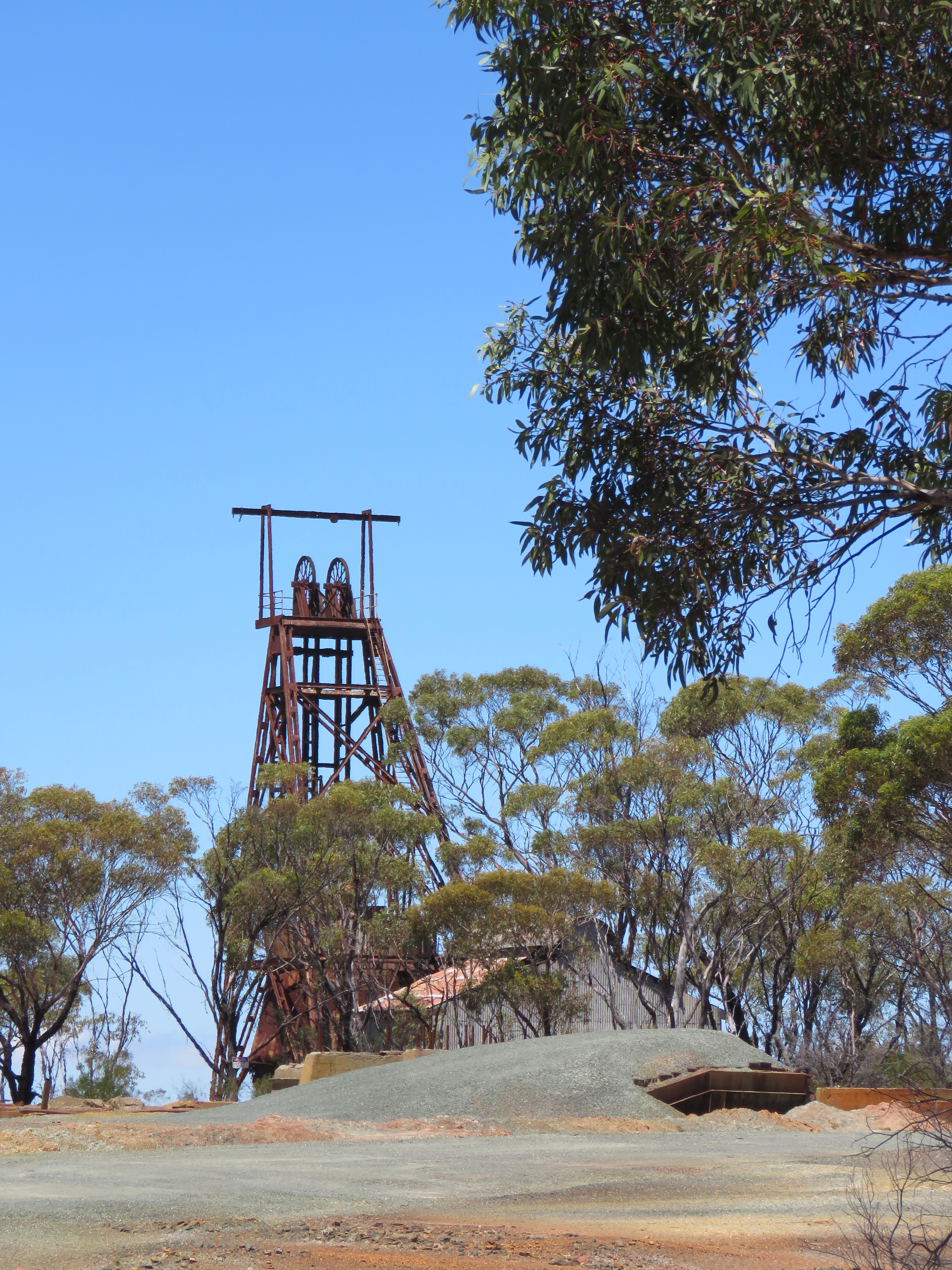
- Head frame at the Elverdton Copper-Gold Mine, adjacent to the Desmond townsite

- Interactive map of Desmond
- Coordinates: 33.628107°S 120.143992°E
- Country: Australia
- State: Western Australia
- LGA: Shire of Ravensthorpe
- Location: 441 km (274 mi) SE of Perth; 34 km (21 mi) N of Hopetoun; 10 km (6.2 mi) SE of Ravensthorpe
- Established: 1909

Government
  - State electorate: Roe
  - Federal division: O'Connor

Area
  - Total: 0.76 km^{2} (0.29 sq mi)
- Postcode: 6346

Desmond is an abandoned mining town of the Shire of Ravensthorpe in the Goldfields-Esperance region of Western Australia. It is located within the locality of Ravensthorpe, on the Hopetoun to Ravensthorpe Road.

== History ==
Desmond is located on the traditional land of the Wudjari people of the Noongar nation.

Desmond was a siding on the Hopetoun to Ravensthorpe railway line, which operated from 1909 to 1946, but the Desmond siding was closed by 1935. The townsite of Desmond was gazetted at the railway siding in 1909, originally as Eldverton, after the nearby mine. When the Eldverton mine itself received a siding the following year, it became necessary to rename the townsite, with Desmond chosen, after the nearby Mount Desmond.

The Desmond Townsite is listed on the shire's heritage register. The history of the town was a short one, with interest in mining in the area declining soon after establishment. By 1911, people started leaving the townsite again, with the last inhabitant of the town leaving in 1923. An official map of the townsite from around 1909 shows the town to the south-west of the railway line and siding. The town itself consisted of the north-south running Elverd, Potter, Pender and Hatfield Streets, with 114 blocks of land allocated along them. A school site was also included.

The Desmond Hotel predated the townsite, being established in 1905. The building was dismantled in the 1930s and moved to Ravensthorpe.

The mine and the town were originally named after Bob Elverdton, who found gold and copper in the area in 1900 and a first phase of mining at Elverdton took place during the First World War, when copper was in short supply. The mine also produced gold as a by-product from the copper mining.

A second area of mining at the Elverdton mine, north-east of the townsite, took place between 1956 and 1972, when copper was mined there.
