= Ravensthorpe =

Ravensthorpe may refer to any of the following places.

== England ==
- Ravensthorpe, Dewsbury in West Yorkshire
  - Ravensthorpe railway station, Dewsbury
- Ravensthorpe, Northamptonshire
- Ravensthorpe, Peterborough in Cambridgeshire
- Ravensthorpe, an historic manor in the parish of Boltby, North Yorkshire

== Australia ==
- Ravensthorpe, Western Australia
  - Shire of Ravensthorpe
  - Ravensthorpe Airport
  - Ravensthorpe Nickel Mine
