= Daviesia eurylobos =

Scientific classification
- Kingdom: Plantae
- Clade: Tracheophytes
- Clade: Angiosperms
- Clade: Eudicots
- Clade: Rosids
- Order: Fabales
- Family: Fabaceae
- Subfamily: Faboideae
- Genus: Daviesia
- Species: D. eurylobos

Binomial name
- Daviesia eurylobos Crisp & G.Chandler

Species of flowering plant

Daviesia eurylobos is a species of flowering plant in the family Fabaceae and is endemic to the south-west of Western Australia. It is a spreading shrub with somewhat crowded, egg-shaped to elliptic phyllodes, and yellow and red flowers.

== Description ==
Daviesia eurylobos is a shrub that typically grows to a height of up to 1.5 m (4 ft 11 in) and has spreading branches. Its leaves are reduced to somewhat crowded, egg-shaped to elliptic phyllodes 7–18 mm (0.28–0.71 in) long and 3–7 mm (0.12–0.28 in) wide. The flowers are mostly arranged singly or in pairs in leaf axils on a pedicel 3–5 mm (0.12–0.20 in) long with egg-shaped bracts about 1 mm (0.039 in) long at the base. The sepals are 4–6 mm (0.16–0.24 in) long and joined at the base, the two upper lobes joined for most of their length and the lower three triangular and about 1 mm (0.039 in) long. The standard petal is broadly elliptic, 8–9 mm (0.31–0.35 in) long, 7–8 mm (0.28–0.31 in) wide and yellow with red markings, the wings elliptic and 7–9 mm (0.28–0.35 in) long and the keel 9–10 mm (0.35–0.39 in) long. Flowering occurs in July and August and the fruit is a broadly triangular pod 6–7 mm (0.24–0.28 in) long.

== Taxonomy and naming ==
This species was first formally described in 1997 by Michael Crisp and Gregory T. Chandler, who gave it the name Daviesia euryloba in Australian Systematic Botany from specimens collected 90 km (56 mi) north-east of Ravensthorpe in 1979. Alex George noted in the Australian Systematic Botany Newsletter, that the specific epithet should be lobos meaning 'lobed' (rather than lobos meaning 'a pod'). In 2020, the epithet was corrected to eurylobos in the journal Nuytsia.

== Distribution and habitat ==
Daviesia eurylobos grows in heathland and mallee and is found between Ravensthorpe, Lake King, Peak Charles National Park and Jerdacuttup in the Esperance plains and Mallee biogeographic regions of south-western Western Australia.

== Conservation status ==
Daviesia eurylobos is listed as "not threatened" by the Department of Biodiversity, Conservation and Attractions
