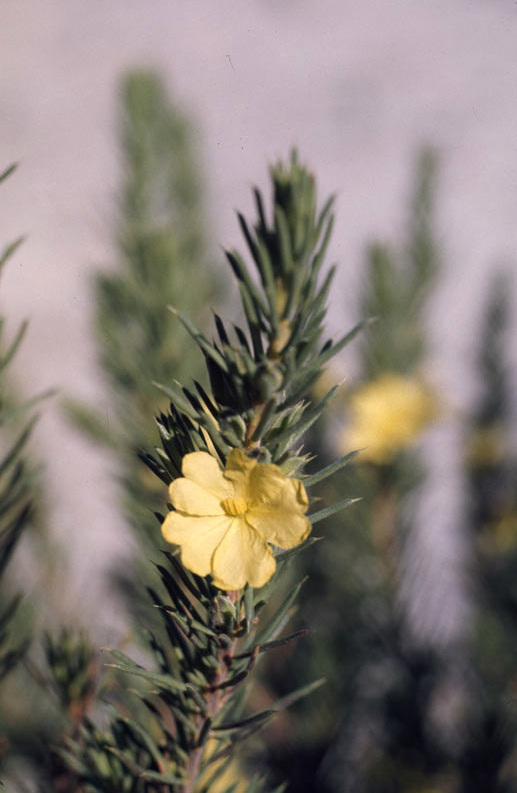

Scientific classification
- Kingdom: Plantae
- Clade: Tracheophytes
- Clade: Angiosperms
- Clade: Eudicots
- Order: Dilleniales
- Family: Dilleniaceae
- Genus: Hibbertia
- Species: H. mucronata

Binomial name
- Hibbertia mucronata (Turcz.) Benth.

= Hibbertia mucronata =

Prickly hibbertia

Species of flowering plant

Hibbertia mucronata is a species of flowering plant in the family Dilleniaceae and is endemic to the south of Western Australia. It is an erect shrub with hairy branches, crowded, thick, tapering linear leaves ending in a sharp point, and golden yellow flowers with five stamens fused at their bases, all on one side of two densely hairy carpels.

== Description ==
Hibbertia mucronata is a shrub that typically grows to a height of up to 1 m (3 ft 3 in) and has woolly-hairy branchlets. The leaves are crowded, spirally arranged, thick, linear tapering to a sharp point, 5–18 mm (0.20–0.71 in) long and 0.9–1.5 mm (0.035–0.059 in) wide on a petiole 1.0–1.5 mm (0.039–0.059 in) long. The flowers are arranged singly in leaf axils and more or less sessile or on a hairy peduncle up to 2 mm (0.079 in) long, sometimes with sharply-pointed bracts at the base. The five sepals are joined at the base, the outer sepals 6.0–8.5 mm (0.24–0.33 in) long, the inner ones 5–5.5 mm (0.20–0.22 in) long. The five petals are golden yellow, egg-shaped with the narrower end towards the base and 6–9 mm (0.24–0.35 in) long with a notch at the tip. There are five stamens, fused at the base on one side of the two densely hairy carpels that each contain two ovules. Flowering mostly occurs between August and December.

== Taxonomy ==
Hibbertia mucronata was first formally described in 1852 by Nikolai Turczaninow who gave it the name Pleurandra mucronata in Bulletin de la Société Impériale des Naturalistes de Moscou. In 1863 George Bentham changed the name to Hibbertia mucronata in Flora Australiensis. The specific epithet (mucronata) means "mucronate", referring to the leaves.

== Distribution and habitat ==
This species grows in rocky places or in sandy heath or mallee-scrub in the Fitzgerald River National Park and east to Ravensthorpe and Hopetoun in the south of Western Australia.

== Conservation status ==
Hibbertia mucronata is classified as "not threatened" by the Western Australian Government Department of Parks and Wildlife.

== See also ==
- List of Hibbertia species
