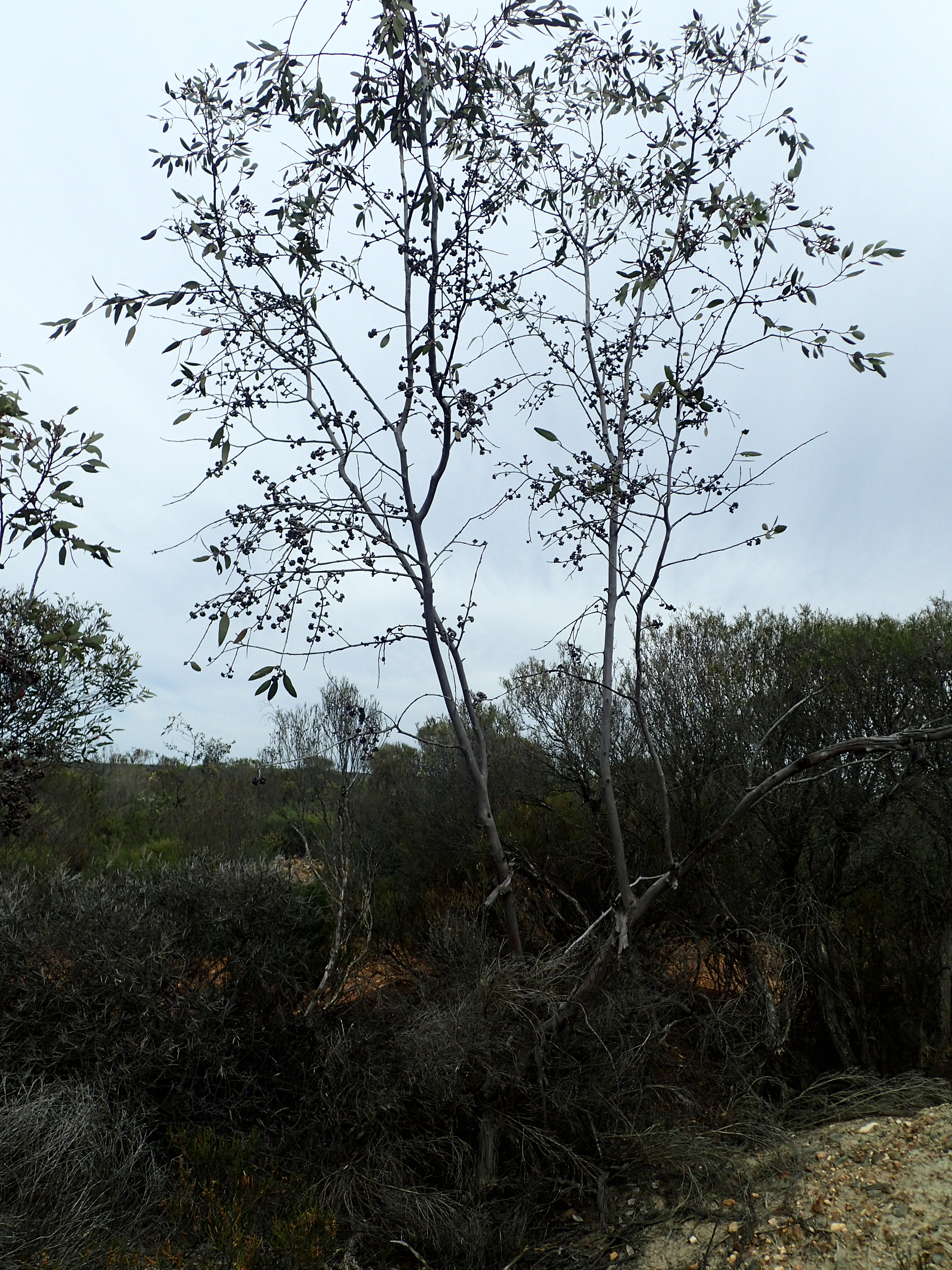
- Near Ravensthorpe

Conservation status
- Endangered (IUCN 3.1)

- Priority Four — Rare Taxa (DEC)

Scientific classification
- Kingdom: Plantae
- Clade: Tracheophytes
- Clade: Angiosperms
- Clade: Eudicots
- Clade: Rosids
- Order: Myrtales
- Family: Myrtaceae
- Genus: Eucalyptus
- Species: E. desmondensis

Binomial name
- Eucalyptus desmondensis Maiden & Blakely

= Eucalyptus desmondensis =

Desmond mallee

Species of eucalyptus

Eucalyptus desmondensis, commonly known as Desmond mallee, is a species of slender mallee that is endemic to a small area in the south-west of Western Australia. It has smooth bark, lance-shaped adult leaves, flower buds in groups of between nine and nineteen, cream-coloured to pale yellow flowers and cup-shaped to barrel-shaped fruit.

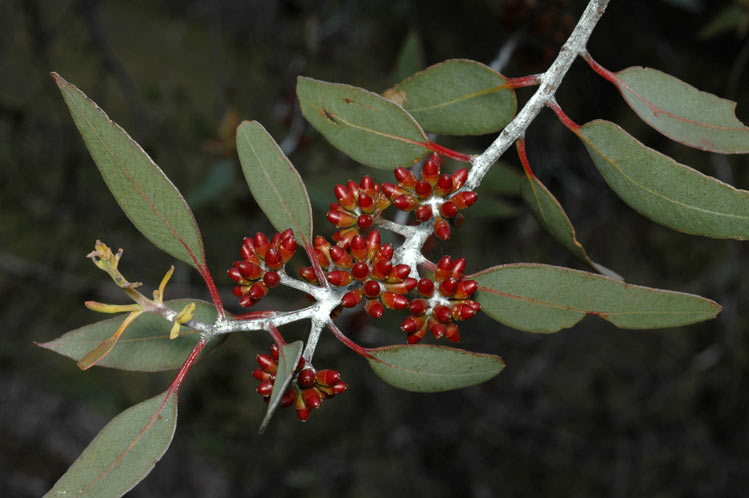
Foliage

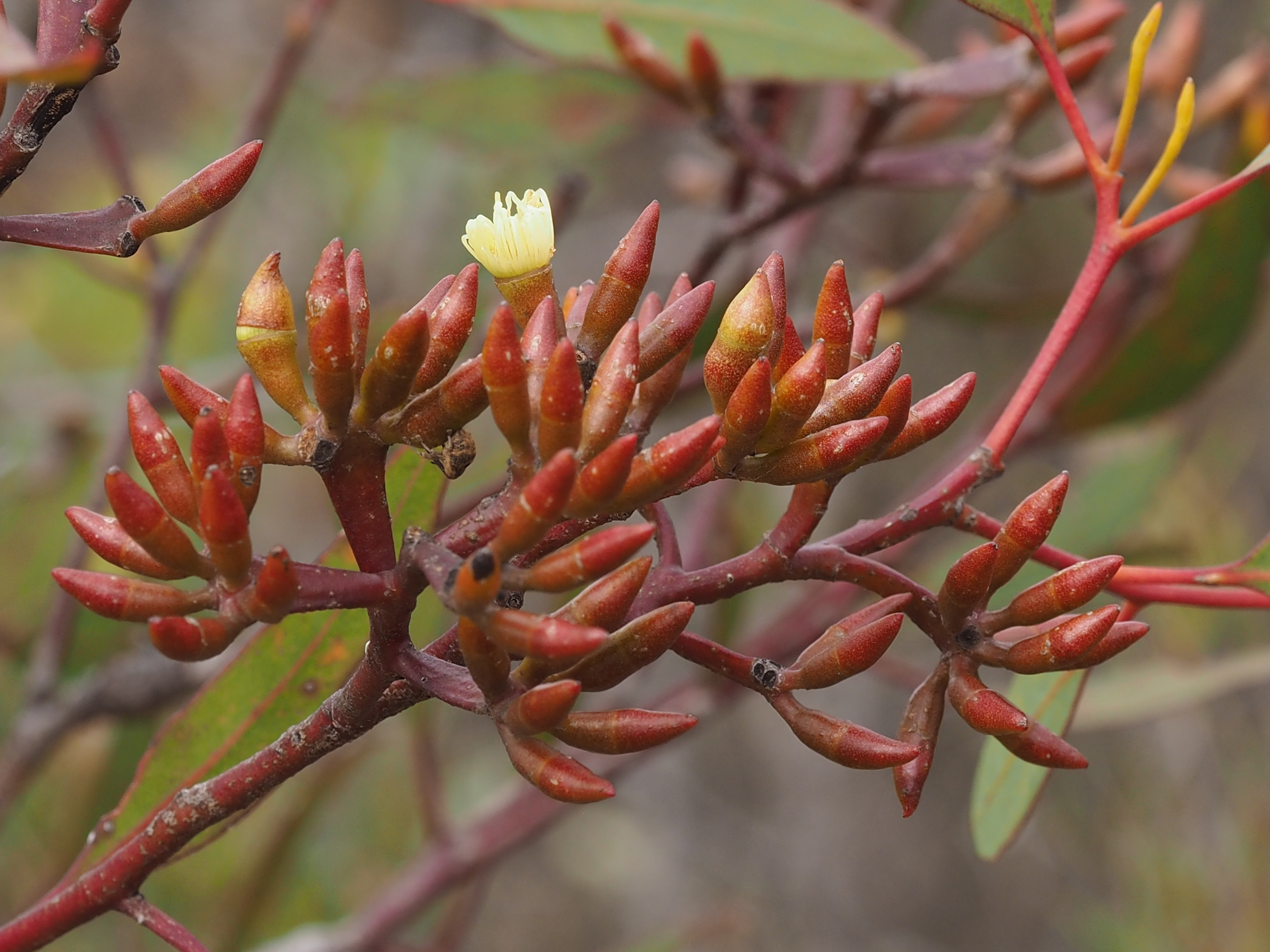
Flower buds

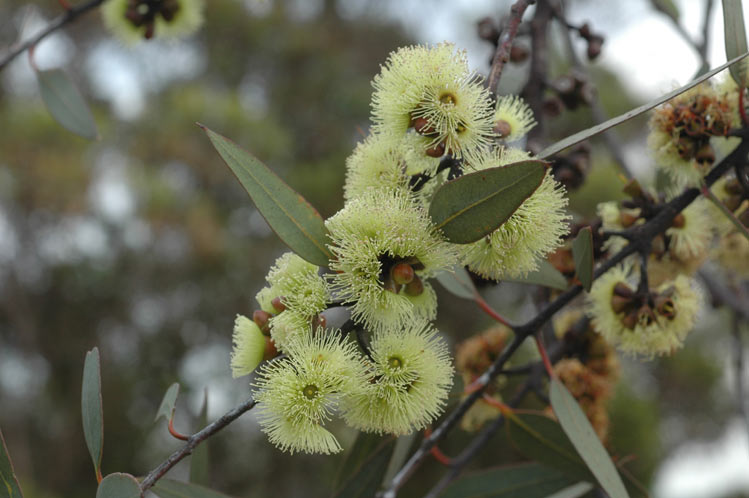
Flowers

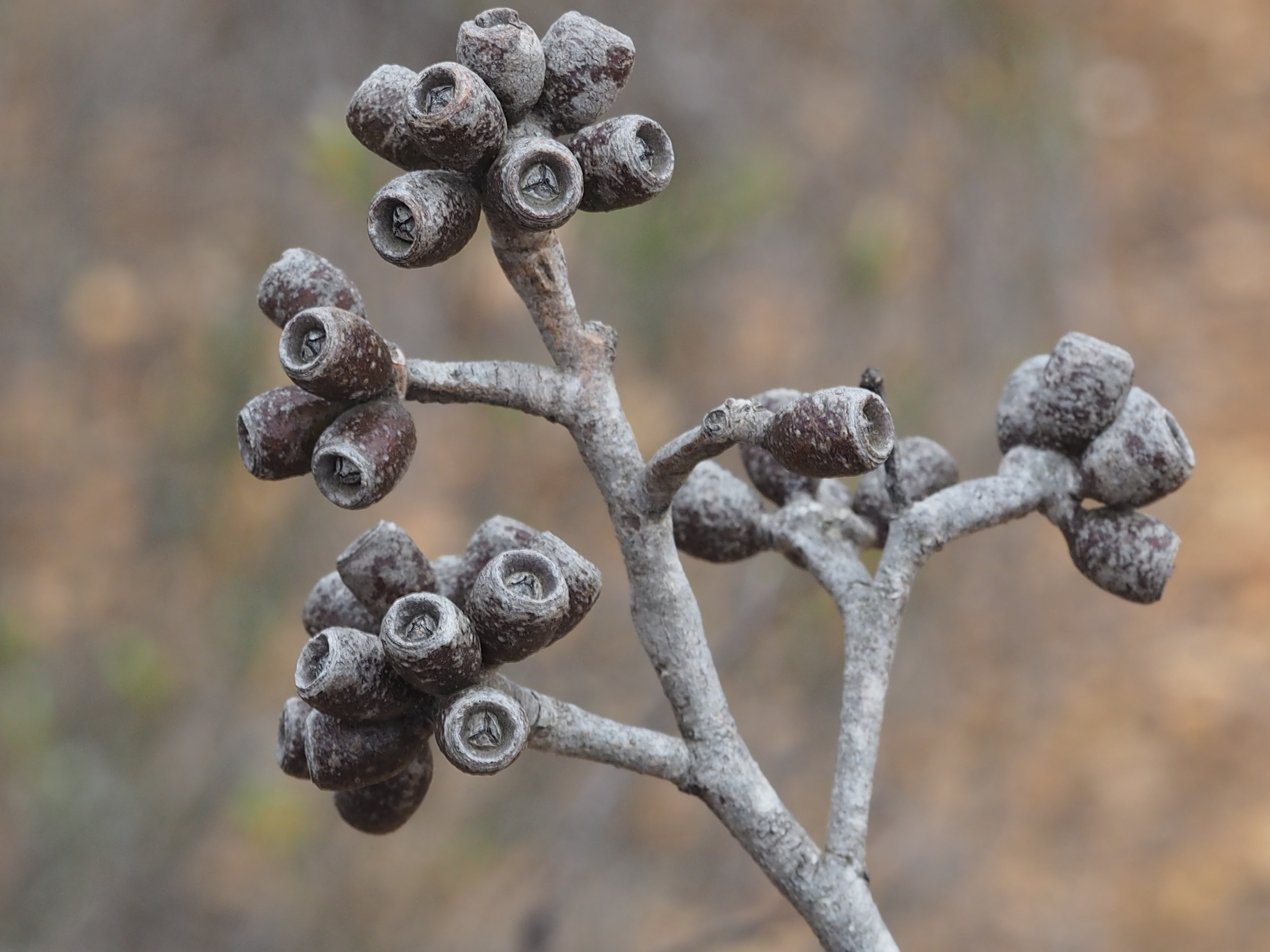
Fruit

== Description ==
Eucalyptus desmondensis is a slender, willowy mallee that typically grows to a height of 1–4.5 m (3 ft 3 in – 14 ft 9 in) and forms a lignotuber. It has smooth whitish or pale brown bark, sometimes a drooping crown, and glaucous branchlets. Young plants and coppice regrowth have stems that are more or less square in cross-section and egg-shaped leaves 55–110 mm (2.2–4.3 in) long and 20–50 mm (0.79–1.97 in) wide. Adult leaves are arranged alternately, thick, the same glossy grey-green on both sides. They are lance-shaped, 55–110 mm (2.2–4.3 in) long and 15–25 mm (0.59–0.98 in) wide on a petiole 12–20 mm (0.47–0.79 in) long. The flower buds are arranged in leaf axils in groups of between nine and nineteen on a flattened, glaucous, unbranched peduncle 7–20 mm (0.28–0.79 in) long. The individual buds are sessile or borne on a pedicel up to 3 mm (0.12 in) long. Mature buds are oval, non-glaucous, 7–12 mm (0.28–0.47 in) long and 4–6 mm (0.16–0.24 in) wide with a conical operculum that is slightly longer than the floral cup. Flowering mainly occurs between May and November and the flowers are cream-coloured to pale yellow. The fruit is a woody cup-shaped to short barrel-shaped capsule 5–10 mm (0.20–0.39 in) long and 6–9 mm (0.24–0.35 in) wide.

== Taxonomy and naming ==
Eucalyptus desmondensis was first formally described in 1925 by Joseph Maiden and William Blakely from specimens collected by Charles Austin Gardner in 1924. The description was published in Journal and Proceedings of the Royal Society of New South Wales. The specific epithet (desmondensis) refers to the locality Desmond, a former mining town near Ravensthorpe. The ending -ensis is a Latin suffix "denoting place, locality, or country".

== Distribution and habitat ==
Desmond mallee is found on sandplains and rocky hillsides in a small part of the southern Goldfields-Esperance region of Western Australia centered around the Fitzgerald River National Park where it grows in stony clay, loam or sandy granitic based soils. It is most easily seen along the road between Ravensthorpe and Hopetoun.

== Conservation status ==
Eucalyptus desmondensis is classified as "Priority Four" by the Government of Western Australia Department of Parks and Wildlife, meaning that is rare or near threatened. All known populations are on private property or on Crown land and none are in conservation reserves. The IUCN Red List assesses the species as endangered.

== See also ==
- List of Eucalyptus species
