= Ravensthorpe Airport =

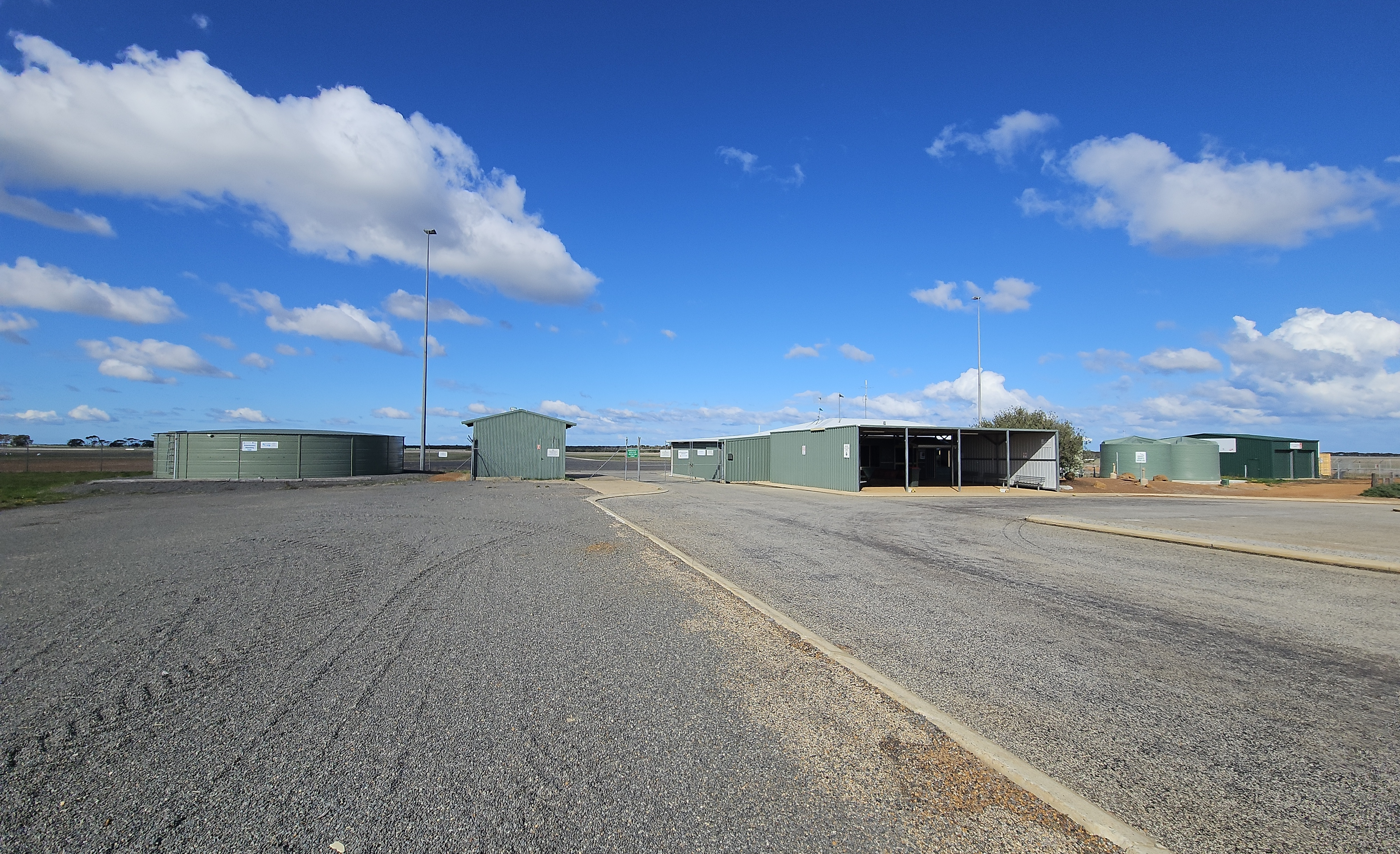
- Ravensthorpe Airport in May, 2026
- IATA: RVT; ICAO: YNRV

Summary
- Airport type: Public
- Operator: Shire of Ravensthorpe
- Location: Ravensthorpe, Western Australia
- Elevation AMSL: 209 ft (64 m)
- Coordinates: 33°47′50″S 120°12′29″E

Map
- Location in Western Australia

Runways
Direction	Length		Surface
Direction	m	ft	Surface
06/24	1,680	5,512	Asphalt
14/32	1,200	3,937	Gravel

Statistics
- Passengers (2016/2017): 8954
- Sources: Australian AIP and aerodrome chart

Ravensthorpe Airport (IATA: RVT, ICAO: YNRV) is an airport near Ravensthorpe, Western Australia. The airport is located 28 kilometres (17 mi) south of Ravensthorpe and 19 kilometres (12 mi) north of Hopetoun. The A$5-million, equivalent to A$7.9 million in 2022, airport was opened on 5 December 2004, when the first flight landed. The airport is managed by the Shire of Ravensthorpe, and was built to support the local mines. The airport also received A$17,000 in funds for security upgrades in 2005.

== Airlines and destinations ==
Virgin Australia Regional Airlines have been known to operate Fokker 100s to Ravensthorpe once a week as charter flights as per a contract with First Quantum Metals to support the Ravensthorpe Nickel Mine.

Skippers Aviation is also known to operate Fairchild Metroliners and Dash-8 Q300 aircraft to Ravensthorpe less regularly as charter flights.

== Accidents and incidents ==
On 29 August 2006 at 17:45 local time, VH-NJE, a BAe-146-100 aircraft operated by National Jet Express, departed from Ravensthorpe toward Perth. As the aircraft passed through FL130 the flight crew recalled noticing a strange smell in the flight deck. Shortly after noticing a strange smell the pilot in command heard a number of "popping noises" accompanied by a series of bright flashing yellow lights and glowing behind the escape rope panel on the first officers side of the flight deck. The crew donned their oxygen masks and returned to Ravensthorpe where they landed safely. The investigation determined that the aircraft's "A" windscreen electrostatic filter had failed. That failure was consistent with an electrical arcing event. In response to this and a number of other similar failures in Europe, the aircraft manufacturer undertook a number of safety actions, including issuing a service information letter advising operators to check the correct positioning of the insulation blankets in the vicinity of their aircraft electrostatic filters at the next available opportunity. The Australian Transport Safety Bureau has issued two safety recommendations that seek to reduce the likelihood of electrical arcing events in "A" windscreen filters in BAe 146 aircraft.

On 21 January 2013, Skywest Flight 141, a Fokker 50, was nearing its scheduled stopover at Ravensthorpe from Esperance. At approximately 9:30 am passengers and crew reported smelling burning rubber from the cabin; the smell momentarily disappeared then reappeared stronger. The flight crew made an emergency landing at Ravensthorpe where passengers were evacuated to the tarmac before being ferried by bus to the terminal. The airport was closed until the plane was inspected and deemed fit to fly.

== See also ==
- List of airports in Western Australia
- Aviation transport in Australia
