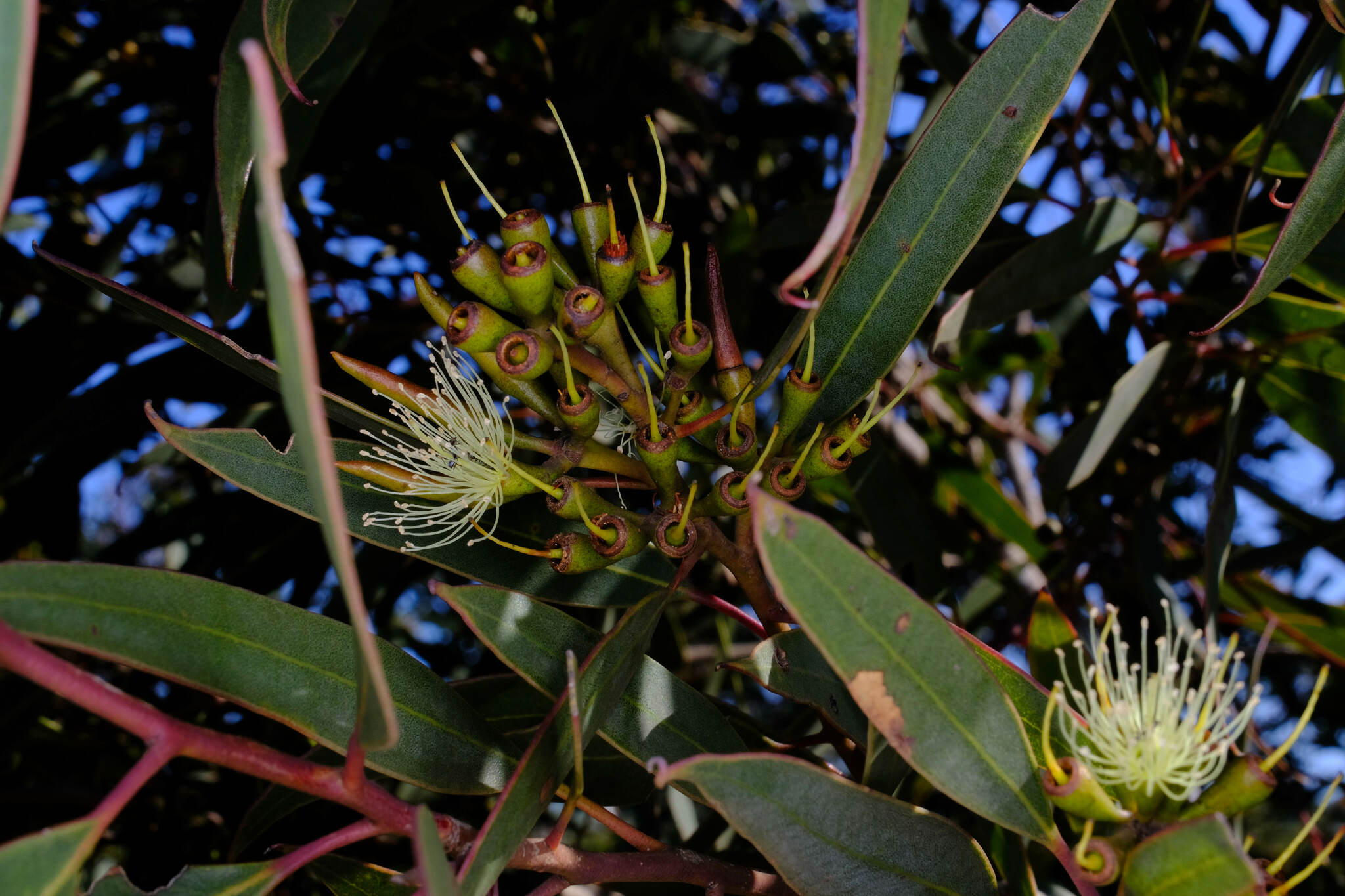

Conservation status
- Vulnerable (IUCN 3.1)

Scientific classification
- Kingdom: Plantae
- Clade: Tracheophytes
- Clade: Angiosperms
- Clade: Eudicots
- Clade: Rosids
- Order: Myrtales
- Family: Myrtaceae
- Genus: Eucalyptus
- Species: E. tumida

Binomial name
- Eucalyptus tumida Brooker & Hopper

= Eucalyptus tumida =

Species of eucalyptus

Eucalyptus tumida is a species of mallee that is endemic to the south coast of Western Australia. It has smooth bark, lance-shaped adult leaves, flower buds in groups of eleven to fifteen, white to pale yellow flowers and cylindrical fruit.

== Description ==
Eucalyptus tumida is a mallee that typically grows to a height of 1.5 to 4 metres (5 to 13 ft) but can grow as high as 8 metres (26 ft), and forms a lignotuber. It has smooth brown and grey bark. Young plants and coppice regrowth have dull bluish green leaves that are 60–75 mm (2.4–3.0 in) long and 33–45 mm (1.3–1.8 in) wide. Adult leaves are the same shade of green on both sides, 60–100 mm (2.4–3.9 in) long and 12–25 mm (0.47–0.98 in) wide, tapering to a petiole 10–20 mm (0.39–0.79 in) long. The flower buds are arranged in leaf axils in groups of eleven to fifteen on a flattened, unbranched peduncle 10–20 mm (0.39–0.79 in) long, the individual buds on pedicels 1–4 mm (0.039–0.157 in) long. Mature buds are sausage-shaped, 12–22 mm (0.47–0.87 in) long and 3–5 mm (0.12–0.20 in) wide with a horn-shaped operculum that is about three times as long as the floral cup. Flowering occurs from September to February and the flowers are creamy white to pale yellow.

== Taxonomy and naming ==
Eucalyptus tumida was first formally described in 1991 by Ian Brooker and Stephen Hopper in the journal Nuytsia from specimens collected by Brooker in 1983, north-east of Esperance. The specific epithet (tumida) is from the Latin word tumidus meaning "swollen", referring to the flowering buds, the largest in the series Levispermae to which it belongs.

== Distribution and habitat ==
This mallee is found on flats and rises between in near-coastal areas between Ravensthorpe, Israelite Bay and Salmon Gums, where it grows in calcareous sandy-clay-loam soils.

== Conservation status ==
This eucalypt is classified as "not threatened" by the Western Australian Government Department of Parks and Wildlife. The IUCN Red List assesses the species as Vulnerable.

== See also ==
- List of Eucalyptus species
