= Kukenarup Memorial =

Memorial near Ravensthorpe, Western Australia

Coordinates: 33°36′05″S 119°53′54″E

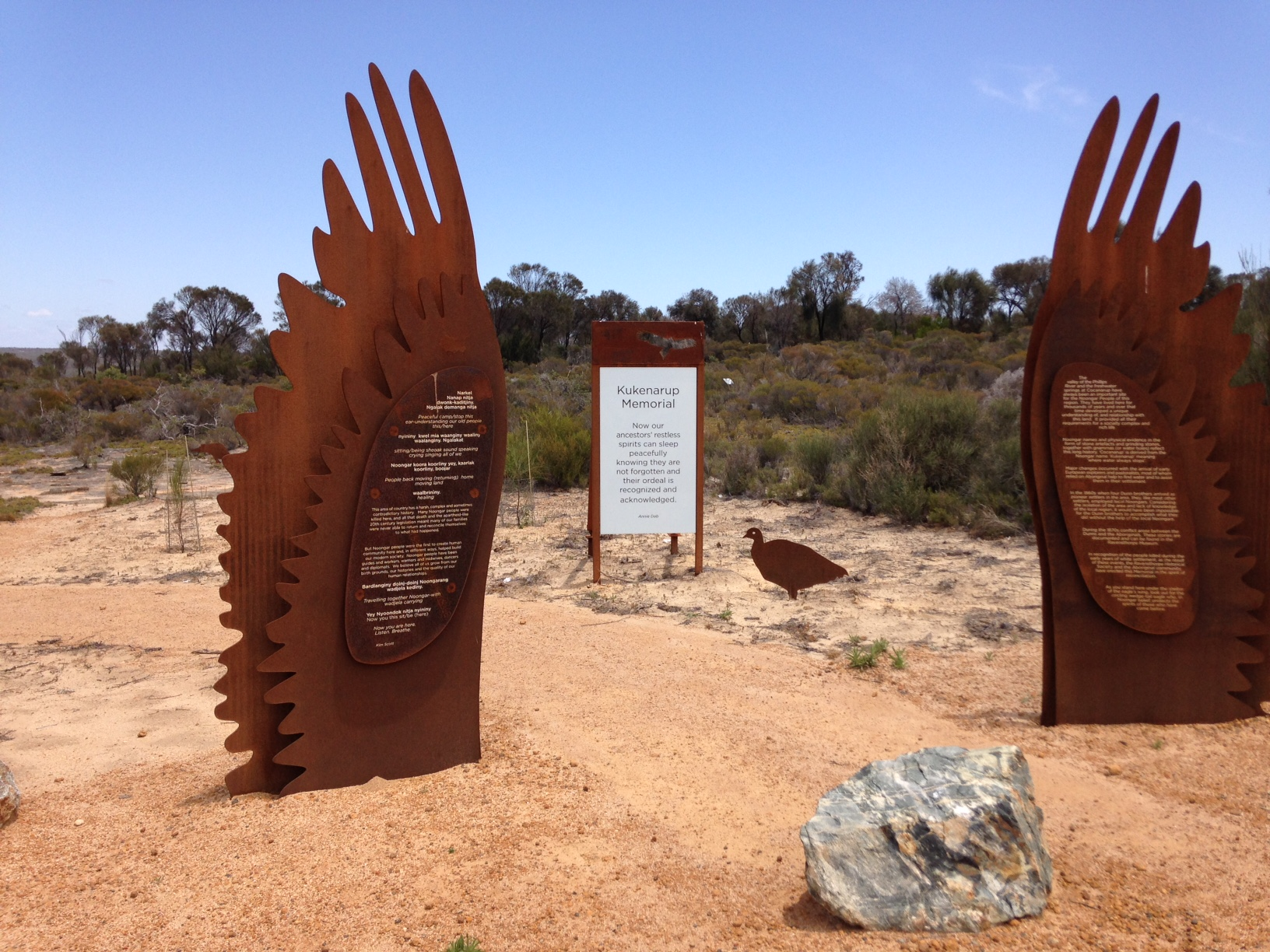
Plaques and sculptures at Kukenarup Memorial

The Kukenarup Memorial is a memorial 15 kilometres (9.3 mi) west of Ravensthorpe, Western Australia that commemorates the killing of many Noongar people following the death of John Dunn, whose family had taken out a pastoral lease in the 1870s. Reports of the incidents vary. The memorial to the historical incident was opened in May 2015 in the region.

== History ==
Accounts agree that John Dunn was killed in 1880. Yandawalla (Yungala) was arrested and charged with the crime. Dartaban (Dartemera, "Jumbo") was also involved, and was a witness in the trial of Yandawalla in 1881. Yandawalla was acquitted of the murder. Reprisal killings of a number of Noongar people occurred, seemingly both before and after that acquittal. John Dunn's grave is at Cocanarup Homestead.

There is a plaque, display board and boards along a walk trail with quotes from various Noongar community members and families at the memorial.

== General references ==
- Brockway, Marian "The Dunns of Cocanarup", Journal of the Royal Western Australian Historical Society (Inc.) vol 11, Part 4.
- Brown, H and Scott K. Kayang and Me, Fremantle Arts Centre Press, 2005, pp. 64–73
- Eades, A and Roberts, P Report on Documentation of Research into Aboriginal Involvement in the South-west of Western Australia. Community Consultation for the Seaman Land Enquiry (unpublished). 1984.
- Forrest, Roni Gray Kukenarup – Two Stories: A Report on historical accounts of a Massacre site at Cocanarup near Ravensthorpe W.A.
- Forrest R & Crowe, S Yarra-mo-up: Place of the tall Yate Trees: A Noongar Social History of the Jerramungup Region. Report prepared for the Australian Heritage Commission and the Heritage Council of Western Australia
- Southern Australian Register (Adelaide, SA: 1839-1900, 1881, p. 6)
- Sunday Times, Perth WA: 1902-1954, Sunday 20 May 1928 p. 7; Thursday 2 February 1939, p. 77
- The Inquirer and Commercial News (Perth, WA 1855-1901, Wednesday, November 1881, p. 2
- The West Australian (Perth, WA 1879-1954, Tuesday 13 April 1880, page 3; Tuesday 27 April 1880, pp. 2–3; Friday 28 October 1881, page 3; Tuesday 30 May 1882 p. 3; Saturday 26 September 1885, p. 5; Tuesday 13 April, p. 3; Tuesday 27 April, pp. 2–3; Friday 28 October 1881 p. 3; Saturday 26 September 1885
- Western Mail (Perth, WA : 1885 - 1954), Thursday 17 October 1935, page 8; Thursday 2 February 1939, p. 77.
- Thomas, G (no date) Cocanarup Homestead – Ravensthorpe. Leaflet at Ravensthorpe Museum.
