= Ravensthorpe Nickel Mine =

Nickel mine in Western Australia

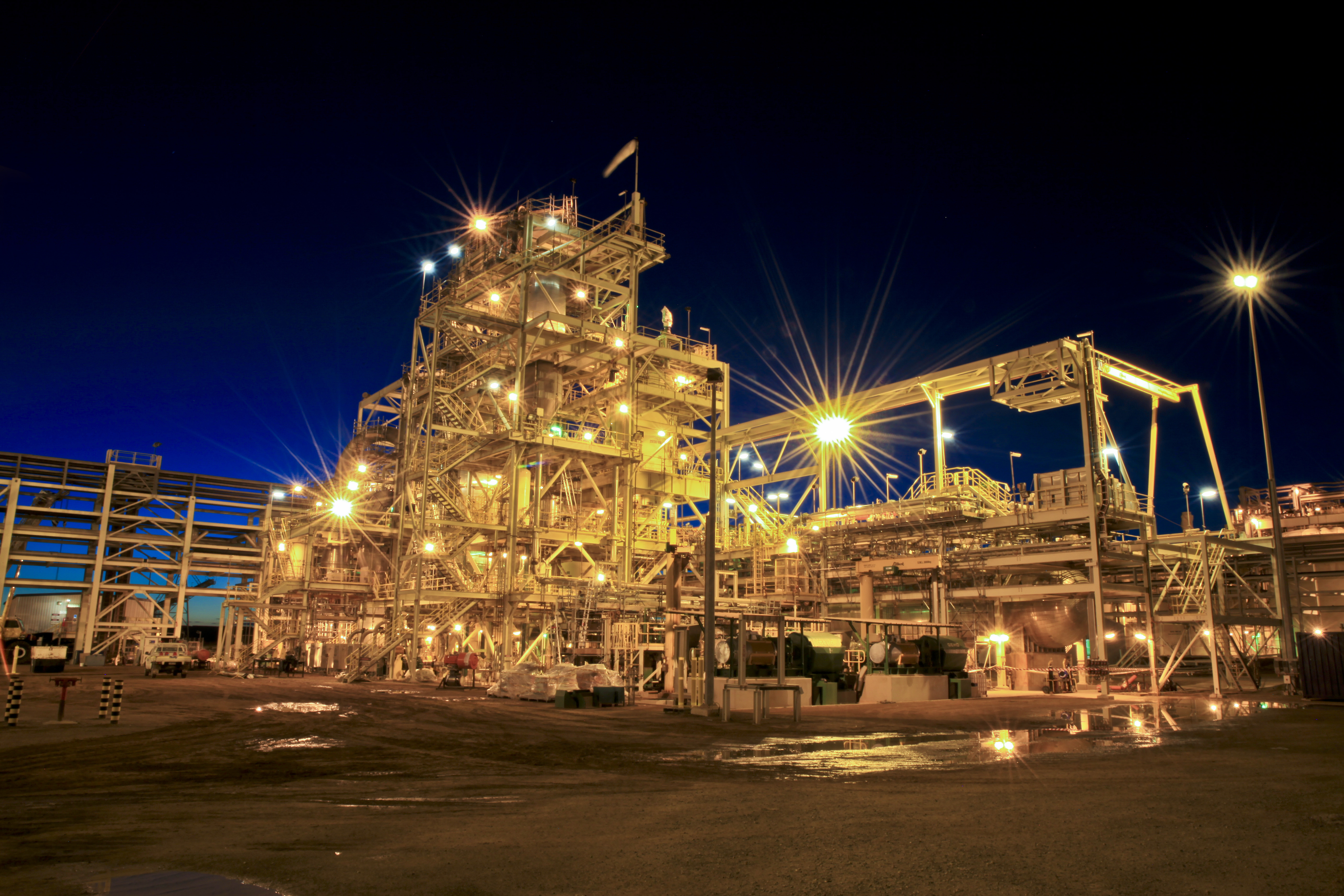
- Plant at night

- Location in Western Australia
- Interactive map of Ravensthorpe Nickel Mine
- Location: Ravensthorpe, Western Australia, Australia; 33°38′42″S 120°23′49″E
- Products: Mixed nickel-cobalt hydroxide
- Production: 21,725 (contained tonnes)
- Financial year: 2023
- Opened: 2008
- Active: 2008–2009, 2011–2017, 2020–
- Company: First Quantum Minerals (70%); POSCO (30%)
- Website: First Quantum Minerals
- Acquired: 2010

The Ravensthorpe Nickel Mine is a nickel mine and hydrometallurgical processing plant located at Bandalup Hill, 35 km (22 mi) east of Ravensthorpe, Western Australia.

Built by BHP Billiton, it was closed in January 2009, after less than a year of operation due to a collapse in the price of nickel. It was sold in December 2009 to First Quantum Minerals who reopened the mine in December 2011, after 18 months of modifications and re-commissioning. Following a period of low nickel prices, the operation was placed on care and maintenance in October 2017. Production recommenced in January 2020 with POSCO purchasing a 30% shareholding in May 2021.

== History ==
Mining in Ravensthorpe considerably predates the current nickel mine, with gold discoveries dating back to 1898. The town experienced a down turn after World War I but mining for copper continued up until the 1970s. A railway line connected Ravensthorpe with the port of Hopetoun from 1901 to 1925, when the line was closed.

BHP Billiton commenced a feasibility study in 2002 into opening a nickel and cobalt mine and processing plant at the cost of A$1.4 billion 35 km (22 mi) east of the town of Ravensthorpe.

The project was approved in 2004 and construction commenced shortly afterward. The plant known as the Ravensthorpe Nickel Project was commissioned in late 2007 with first production occurring in October and the first 5,000 tonnes being produced by December 2007. The plant was officially opened in 2008, after massive cost blow outs and delays. Production was expected to total 50,000 tonnes of nickel per year.

In January 2009, BHP Billiton announced that it was suspending production at the Ravensthorpe Nickel Mine indefinitely due to the reduction in world nickel prices caused by the global economic crisis. The decision cut 1,800 jobs and was expected to have a major impact on the local economy. Nickel prices, having reached a high of US$50,000 per tonne in May 2007, had fallen to under $11,000 per tonne by the time of the mine's closure. The closure had a devastating effect on the local communities of Ravensthorpe and Hopetoun and led to BHP Billiton being heavily criticised for its handling of the closure.

On 9 December 2009, BHP Billiton announced it had agreed terms to sell the mine to First Quantum Minerals for US$340 million. First Quantum was one of three bidders for the mine and actually produced the lowest offer. First Quantum won the bid despite offers from Minara Resources at US$360 million and Poseidon Nickel at US$400 million being higher than theirs. BHP Billiton said that the lower price was accepted due to fewer conditions being imposed by the tenderer. The sale was completed on 10 February 2010.

First Quantum Minerals spent eighteen months implementing extensive modifications to improve the ore processing at the front end of the plant, through the construction of two new crushers, new product storage ponds and a new dewatering facility. Recommissioning began in the second quarter of 2011, with first nickel produced in October 2011. Problems BHP faced in the crushing, beneficiation and rejects plants were successfully resolved.

Production resumed in January 2020 with First Quantum Minerals selling a 30% shareholding in the mine to POSCO in May 2021.

In January 2024, mining was suspended and 30% of the 420 workforce lost their jobs as a result of weak nickel prices. Processing of existing stockpiles would however continue, which could take up to two years to complete, after which mining is scheduled to resume.

In April 2024, RNO announced they would be closing down operations and going into care and maintenance for the fourth time, cutting down a further estimated 330 jobs.

== Mineral reserves ==
The project comprises five ore bodies, Halleys, Hale-Bopp, Shoemaker-Levy, Nindilbillup and Shoemaker-Levy North, with total proven and probable reserves of 197.2 million tonnes at a grade of 0.6% nickel and 0.03% cobalt (at 31 December 2017). Shoemaker-Levy, the largest ore body, contains 88% of the reserves.

First Quantum expected an annual production of 39,000 tonnes of nickel for the first five years of production and an average of 28,000 tonnes per year for the mine's projected lifetime of 32 years. The operation was placed on care and maintenance in October 2017 due to sustained nickel prices below the cost of production.

Commercial production by First Quantum Minerals was achieved on 28 December 2011. The operation produced 32,884 tonnes of nickel in its first full year of operation in 2012. BHP Billiton, by comparison, produced 14,000 tonnes of nickel from the operation in the nine months the plant operated from its opening in May 2009 before it was mothballed. Citing extended low nickel prices, First Quantum Minerals placed the plant in care and maintenance in October 2017, and most of the staff were made redundant. A small team of maintenance personnel continued to keep the site up. In April 2019 the owner announced that "should market conditions continue to improve, Ravensthorpe could resume operation in the first quarter of 2020."

In 2021, the mine produced 16,818 contained tonnes of nickel (14,018 payable tonnes).

== Atmospheric leach tank collapse ==
On 14 December 2014 a structural failure was caused by corrosion of an atmospheric leach tank's wall, with the subsequent spill contained in the plant's bunded, or protected, area. Nearly 2 Ml (2,000 m^{3}) of acidic slurry exited the tank displacing several transformers and inundated electrical substations and steam turbine generators. Operations at the plant were suspended by the Department of Mines & Petroleum. The accident closed the mine for 49 days. The plant operator pleaded guilty to failing to supply a safe working environment and received a fine of A$40,000.
