= Jerdacuttup, Western Australia =

Jerdacuttup
- Town
- Coordinates: 33.71°S 120.47°E
- Country: Australia
- State: Western Australia
- LGA(s): Shire of Ravensthorpe
- Location: 584 km (363 mi) ESE of Perth; 43 km (27 mi) SE of Ravensthorpe
- Established: 1966

Government
  - State electorate(s): Roe
  - Federal division(s): O'Connor

Area
  - Total: 1,200.5 km^{2} (463.5 sq mi)
- Elevation: 139 m (456 ft)

Population
  - Total(s): 183 (SAL 2021)
- Postcode: 6346
Localities around Jerdacuttup
Ravensthorpe	Munglinup	Munglinup
Hopetoun	Jerdacuttup	Munglinup
	Southern Ocean

Jerdacuttup /ˌdʒɜːrdəˈkʌtʌp/ is a small town in Western Australia 584 kilometres (363 mi) east-south-east of Perth between Ravensthorpe and Hopetoun in the Goldfields–Esperance region of Western Australia. At the 2006 census, Jerdacuttup had a population of six.

John Forrest explored the area in 1870 and spelt the word as Jerdicutup; the area was later surveyed in 1875 by C Price who recorded the name of the area as Jerdicat and Verdicat. Jerdacuttup is an Aboriginal word of unknown meaning.

During the 1960s the south-east of Western Australia was opened for agricultural purposes and the town was developed as a supply centre for the region. The government gazetted the townsite in 1966. The dominant agricultural industry in the area is sheep grazing and cereal cropping with cattle grazing and lupin cropping to a lesser extent. The town is no longer a receival site for Cooperative Bulk Handling.

The Jerdacuttup River is situated about 16 km to the west of the townsite.

Australian underground band The Triffids referenced the town in the song "Jerdacuttup Man", from the album Calenture.
