= Hopetoun to Ravensthorpe railway line =

Former railway line in Western Australia

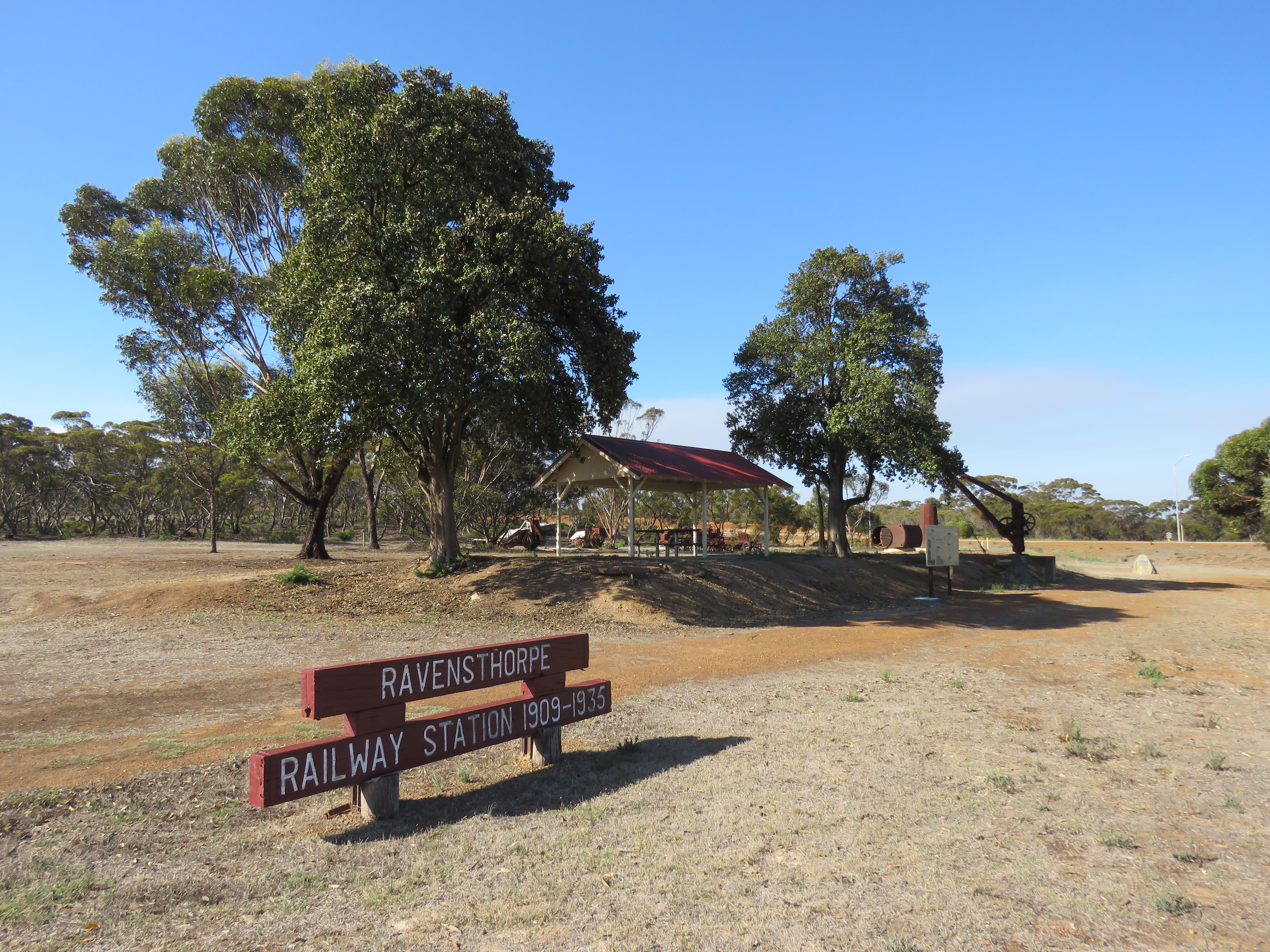
- Site of the former Ravensthorpe railway station

Overview
- Status: Closed
- Owner: Western Australian Government Railways
- Locale: Shire of Ravensthorpe, Goldfields–Esperance, Western Australia
- Termini: Hopetoun; Ravensthorpe

Service
- Operator(s): Western Australian Government Railways

History
- Commenced: 1907
- Opened: 3 June 1909
- Closed: 1946

Technical
- Line length: 55 km (34 mi)
- Number of tracks: 1
- Track gauge: 1,067 mm (3 ft 6 in)
- Hopetoun to Ravensthorpe railway line Main locations

The Hopetoun to Ravensthorpe railway line was a railway line in the Goldfields–Esperance region of Western Australia, connecting Hopetoun to Ravensthorpe. The line, 55 kilometres (34 mi) long, was stand-alone, not connecting to any other railway line in the state.

== History ==
The Hopetoun–Ravensthorpe Railway Act 1906, an act by the Parliament of Western Australia granted assent on 14 December 1906, authorised the construction of a railway line from Hopetoun to Ravensthorpe.

The survey for the new railway line was completed in April 1907, starting at the Hopetoun jetty, and the contract to construct the line was awarded to Baxter & Wood on 12 August 1907. Construction was initially held up by bad weather, commenced in early 1908, and was completed in January 1909. The line was ready for traffic in April 1909 and taken over by the Western Australian Government Railways. The official opening took place on 3 June 1909, with two stations on the line, Hopetoun and Ravensthorpe, and a number of sidings in between, including a private one at the Mt Cattlin gold mine.

The first locomotive on the railway line was a Beyer, Peacock & Company 2-6-0 in 1908, replaced by two Western Australian Government Railways G class 2-6-0s in the following year, with the number of locomotives briefly climbing to five. With the decline of gold mining in the area and a switch to agriculture as the main use of the railway line, the number of locomotives was reduced to two and eventually one, with one going to Esperance and another to Port Hedland. The last WAGR G class, G233, later named the Leschenault Lady, was moved by road to Midland Railway Workshops in 1944.

Passenger services, sometimes combined with freight, initially ran daily between Hopetoun and Ravensthorpe but economic decline in the area led to a suspension of permanent services by 1931. The transport of wheat by rail continued until 1935, when it was moved to road transport and the line closed. In its final year of operation, the 1934–35 financial year, the line only operated for ten weeks, accumulating a heavy loss.

The Railway (Hopetoun–Ravensthorpe) Discontinuance Act 1946, assented to on 13 November 1946, officially closed the railway line. The following year, in 1947, the rails were removed and taken to Newdegate, 100 kilometres (62 mi) away and the closest railway station to Ravensthorpe, to be used on the railway system there.

== Legacy ==
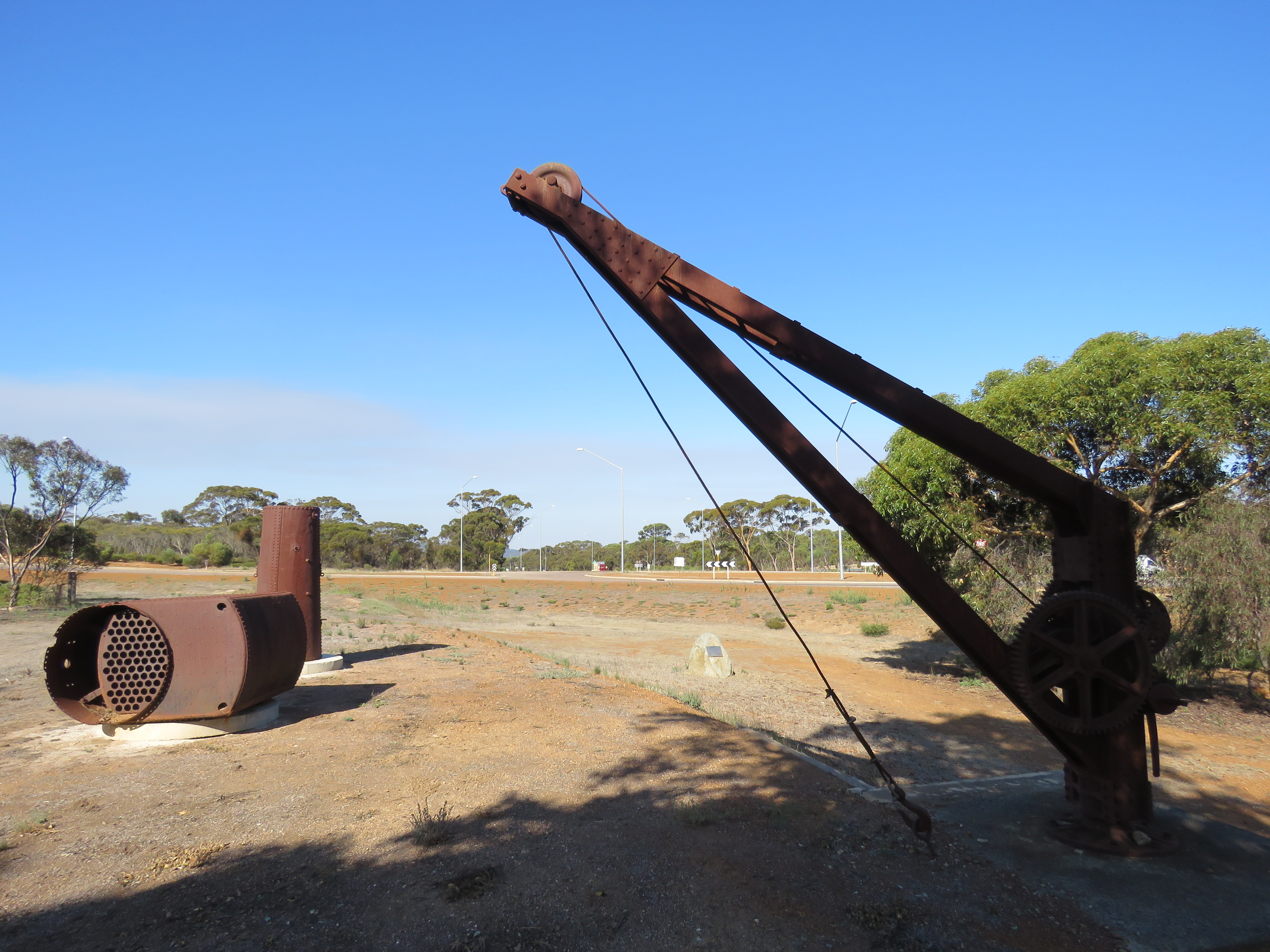
5 ton crane at the site of the former Ravensthorpe railway station

The Shire of Ravensthorpe's heritage register lists the railway as such as well as the former railway station sites at Hopetoun and Ravensthorpe. At Hopetoun, little remains of the former railway facilities, while at Ravensthorpe the 5 ton crane and the loading bank are still in place.

The northern part of the former railway line between Ravensthorpe and Lee Creek and a 5-kilometre (3.1 mi) section around Hopetoun are now part of a 41-kilometre (25 mi) long rail heritage trail.
