= Shire of Ravensthorpe =

Coordinates: 33°36′S 120°08′E

- Local government area
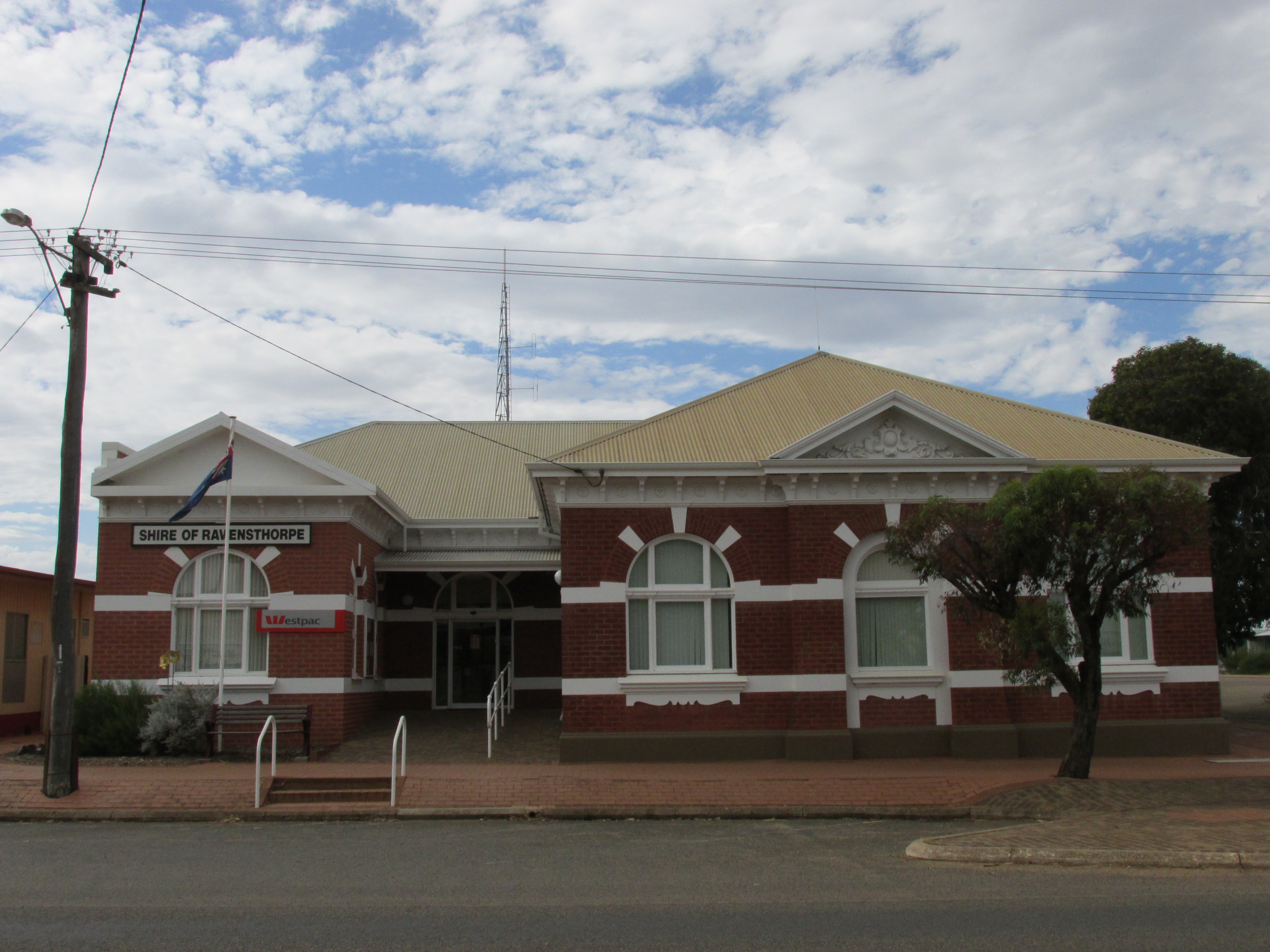
- The Ravensthorpe shire offices

- Interactive map of Shire of Ravensthorpe
- Country: Australia
- State: Western Australia
- Region: Goldfields-Esperance
- Council seat: Ravensthorpe

Government
  - Shire President: Keith Dunlop
  - State electorate: Roe
  - Federal division: O'Connor

Area
  - Total: 13,551.1 km^{2} (5,232.1 sq mi)

Population
  - Total: 2,085 (LGA 2021)
  - Density: 0.15/km^{2} (0.39/sq mi)
- Website: Shire of Ravensthorpe
LGAs around Shire of Ravensthorpe
Lake Grace	Dundas	Esperance
Kent	Shire of Ravensthorpe	Esperance
Jerramungup	Southern Ocean	Southern Ocean

The Shire of Ravensthorpe is a local government area in the southern Goldfields-Esperance region of Western Australia, about halfway between the city of Albany and the town of Esperance and about 530 kilometres (329 mi) southeast of the state capital, Perth. The Shire covers an area of 13,551 square kilometres (5,232 sq mi), and its seat of government is the town of Ravensthorpe.

== History ==
The Phillips River Road District was gazetted on 9 November 1900. On 1 July 1961, it became the Shire of Ravensthorpe under the Local Government Act 1960, which reformed all remaining road districts into shires.

In September 2021, Shire of Ravensthorpe chief executive Gavin Pollock was sacked after being accused of spending almost $55,000 of shire money on a sex worker. A report tabled in the Western Australian State Parliament on 22 September 2021 alleges that Mr Pollock was a client of a sex worker named "Ms E", for whom he issued multiple fake invoices and purchase orders on his office computer totalling $54,850. Two further invoices totalling a combined $13,350 were prepared but not paid as a result of the commission investigation.

== Indigenous people ==
The Shire of Ravensthorpe is located on the traditional land of the Wudjari people of the Noongar nation.

== Wards ==
As of the 2003 election, the Shire is divided into three wards:

- Ravensthorpe Ward (two councillors)
- Hopetoun Ward (two councillors)
- Rural Ward (three councillors)

== Towns and localities ==
The towns and localities of the Shire of Ravensthorpe with population and size figures based on the most recent Australian census:

Locality	Population	Area	Map
Fitzgerald	0 (SAL 2016)	2.87 km^{2} (1.11 sq mi)	
Fitzgerald River National Park * ‡	4 (SAL 2021)	2,420 km^{2} (930 sq mi)	
Hopetoun	1,115 (SAL 2021)	539.8 km^{2} (208.4 sq mi)	
Jerdacuttup	183 (SAL 2021)	1,200.5 km^{2} (463.5 sq mi)	
Munglinup	140 (SAL 2021)	3,044.7 km^{2} (1,175.6 sq mi)	
Ravensthorpe	580 (SAL 2021)	2,542.7 km^{2} (981.7 sq mi)	
West River	71 (SAL 2021)	1,132.8 km^{2} (437.4 sq mi)	

- ( * indicates suburb partially located within City)
- ( ‡ indicates boundaries of national park and locality are not identical)

== Heritage-listed places ==
As of 2023, 122 places are heritage-listed in the Shire of Ravensthorpe, of which one is on the State Register of Heritage Places, the Metropolitan Hotel in Hopetoun.
