= Hopetoun, Western Australia =

Hopetoun
- Town
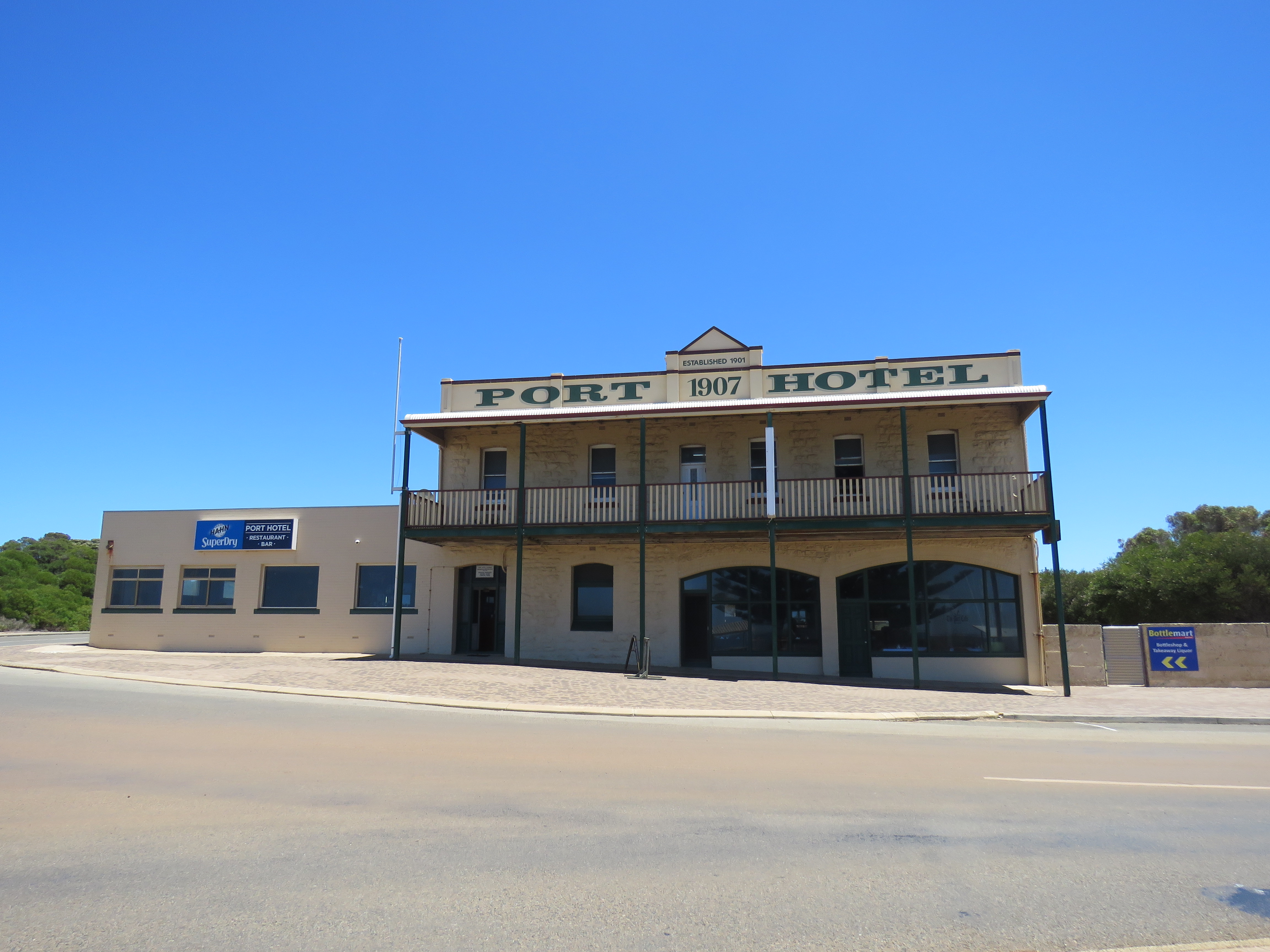
- The heritage listed Port Hotel on Veal Street, Hopetoun

- Interactive map of Hopetoun
- Coordinates: 33.948°S 120.126°E
- Country: Australia
- State: Western Australia
- LGA: Shire of Ravensthorpe
- Location: 591 km (367 mi) southeast of Perth; 160 km (99 mi) west of Esperance; 41 km (25 mi) south of Ravensthorpe
- Established: 1900

Government
  - State electorate: Roe
  - Federal division: O'Connor

Area
  - Total: 539.8 km^{2} (208.4 sq mi)
- Elevation: 13 m (43 ft)

Population
  - Total: 783 (UCL 2021)
- Postcode: 6348
- Mean max temp: 22.0 °C (71.6 °F)
- Mean min temp: 11.6 °C (52.9 °F)
- Annual rainfall: 481.9 mm (18.97 in)
Localities around Hopetoun
Ravensthorpe	Ravensthorpe	Jerdacuttup
Fitzgerald River NP	Hopetoun	Jerdacuttup
	Southern Ocean

Hopetoun is a town on the south coast of Western Australia in the Shire of Ravensthorpe. Located on Mary Ann Harbour, Hopetoun is 590 kilometres (370 mi) south-east of the Western Australian capital city of Perth, 160 kilometres (99 mi) west of Esperance and 41 kilometres (25 mi) south of Ravensthorpe.

== History ==
Mary Ann Harbour was named in November 1865 by the sealer James Sale on the cutter Mary Ann. Mary Ann was owned by whaling master John Thomas of Cheyne's Beach, 65 kilometres (40 mi) east of Albany, who had named it after his eldest daughter.

Hopetoun was established in 1900 as the port servicing the Phillips River goldfield, named after the first Governor-General of Australia, John Hope, 7th Earl of Hopetoun. The townsite was gazetted on 9 February 1901.

The town became a shipping port for the mining industry, with a jetty built in 1901, the terminus of a railway line between Hopetoun and Ravensthorpe that operated from 1909 to 1935. The port was closed in 1937, with the jetty remaining until its destruction in 1983.

Some of the town's electricity is generated by a wind-diesel system. Hopetoun has two 600 kilowatt wind turbines and two low-load diesel generators.

The population in the 2016 census was 871, a 38% fall from 1,398 in 2011, due to the closure of the nearby Ravensthorpe Nickel Mine. Hopetoun was a major site of accommodation for the mine, east of the town of Ravensthorpe. There is a primary school, police station and a doctor has clinics in both Hopetoun and Ravensthorpe. Hopetoun also has a hotel, motel, tavern, bakery, IGA supermarket, two cafes, post office/general store, hairdressers, beauty salon, community resource centre, chemist and two real estate agencies.

== Geography ==
Hopetoun is located just outside the eastern entrance of the Fitzgerald River National Park, separated by bushland and the Culham Inlet with East Mount Barren overlooking the town. The only sealed road into the park, Hamersley Drive, is located on the outskirts of Hopetoun. The surrounding coastal heathlands and shrublands are part of the globally recognised Fitzgerald Biosphere.

== Climate ==
Hopetoun possesses a warm-summer Mediterranean climate (Köppen: Csb) with warm, relatively dry summers and mild, drizzly wet winters. Average maxima vary from 25.5 °C (77.9 °F) in February to 18.1 °C (64.6 °F) in July, while average minima fluctuate between 15.8 °C (60.4 °F) in February and 7.8 °C (46.0 °F) in July. Annual precipitation is rather low, (averaging 481.9 mm (18.97 in), but is quite frequent: being spread across 133.4 precipitation days. Extreme temperatures have ranged from 48.0 °C (118.4 °F) on 6 January 2010 to −1.1 °C (30.0 °F) on 4 July 2014.

Climate data for Hopetoun (33.93°S 120.13°E) (26 m (85 ft) AMSL) (1996-2024 data)
Month	Jan	Feb	Mar	Apr	May	Jun	Jul	Aug	Sep	Oct	Nov	Dec	Year
Record high °C (°F)	48.0 (118.4)	45.8 (114.4)	43.9 (111.0)	38.0 (100.4)	35.1 (95.2)	27.6 (81.7)	26.4 (79.5)	32.2 (90.0)	34.8 (94.6)	39.5 (103.1)	44.5 (112.1)	44.6 (112.3)	48.0 (118.4)
Mean daily maximum °C (°F)	25.1 (77.2)	25.5 (77.9)	24.8 (76.6)	23.3 (73.9)	21.2 (70.2)	18.9 (66.0)	18.1 (64.6)	18.7 (65.7)	20.2 (68.4)	21.3 (70.3)	23.0 (73.4)	24.0 (75.2)	22.0 (71.6)
Mean daily minimum °C (°F)	15.3 (59.5)	15.8 (60.4)	14.6 (58.3)	12.7 (54.9)	10.5 (50.9)	8.7 (47.7)	7.8 (46.0)	7.9 (46.2)	8.7 (47.7)	10.3 (50.5)	12.3 (54.1)	14.0 (57.2)	11.6 (52.8)
Record low °C (°F)	8.2 (46.8)	7.7 (45.9)	6.7 (44.1)	5.0 (41.0)	1.8 (35.2)	0.6 (33.1)	−1.1 (30.0)	0.6 (33.1)	1.4 (34.5)	0.5 (32.9)	4.9 (40.8)	5.8 (42.4)	−1.1 (30.0)
Average precipitation mm (inches)	30.6 (1.20)	23.0 (0.91)	30.5 (1.20)	37.8 (1.49)	43.9 (1.73)	53.1 (2.09)	63.5 (2.50)	57.0 (2.24)	48.7 (1.92)	41.7 (1.64)	31.7 (1.25)	21.5 (0.85)	481.9 (18.97)
Average precipitation days (≥ 0.2 mm)	6.1	6.1	9.4	11.9	13.8	14.5	15.8	15.8	13.9	11.2	8.6	6.3	133.4
Average afternoon relative humidity (%)	63	63	62	62	59	56	57	56	56	59	61	60	60
Average dew point °C (°F)	14.4 (57.9)	14.8 (58.6)	13.9 (57.0)	12.7 (54.9)	10.5 (50.9)	8.0 (46.4)	7.3 (45.1)	7.5 (45.5)	8.3 (46.9)	9.5 (49.1)	11.8 (53.2)	12.7 (54.9)	10.9 (51.7)
Source: Bureau of Meteorology (1996-2024 data)
