= Ravensthorpe, Western Australia =

Ravensthorpe
- Town
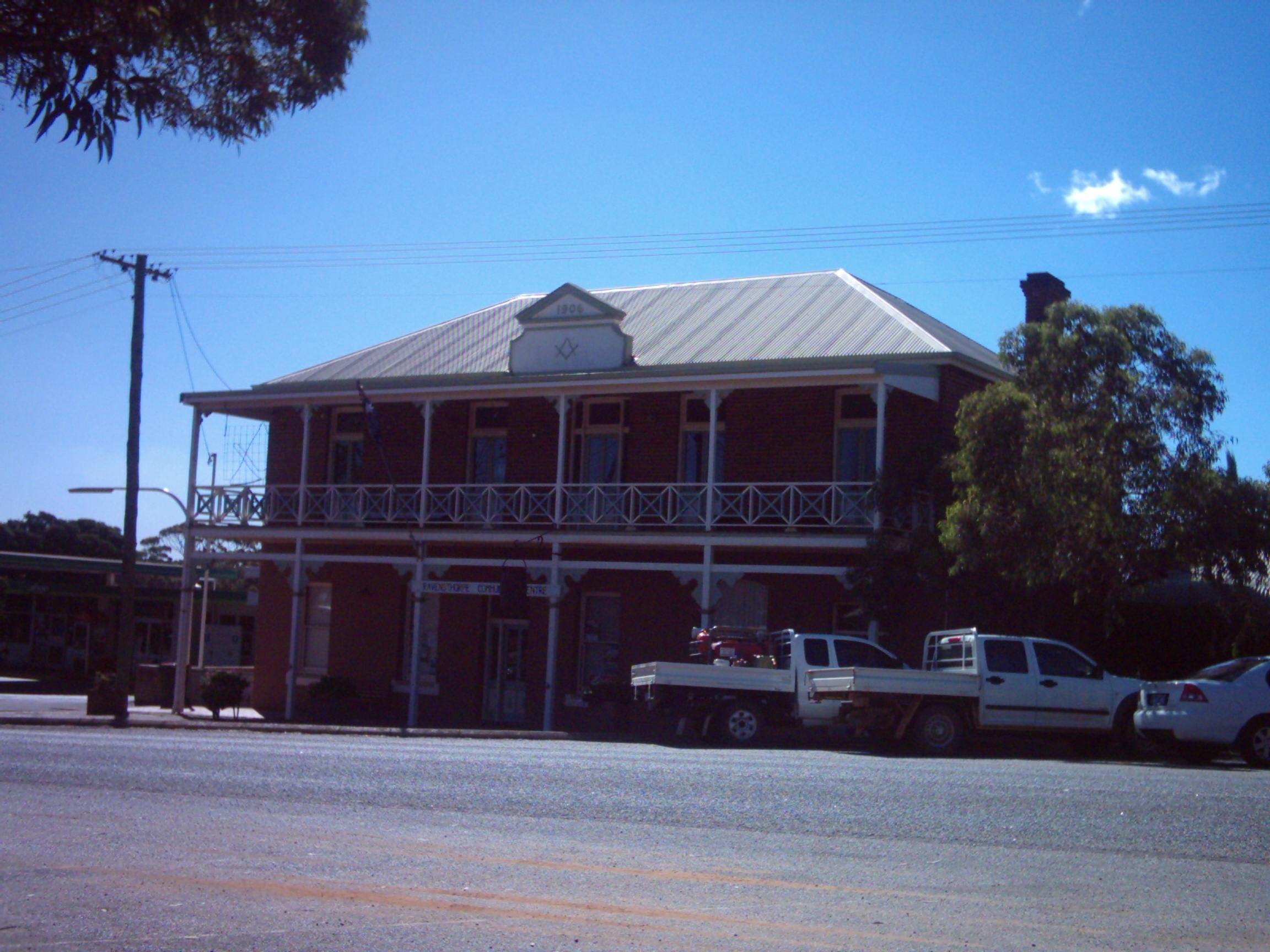
- Ravensthorpe Community Centre, formerly the Freemasons Hotel, built 1906

- Interactive map of Ravensthorpe
- Coordinates: 33°34′54″S 120°2′49″E
- Country: Australia
- State: Western Australia
- LGA: Shire of Ravensthorpe
- Location: 541 km (336 mi) ESE of Perth; 50 km (31 mi) NNW of Hopetoun

Government
  - State electorate: Roe
  - Federal division: O'Connor

Area
  - Total: 2,542.7 km^{2} (981.7 sq mi)
- Elevation: 232 m (761 ft)

Population
  - Total: 350 (UCL 2021)
- Postcode: 6346
- Mean max temp: 22.7 °C (72.9 °F)
- Mean min temp: 10.4 °C (50.7 °F)
- Annual rainfall: 425.3 mm (16.74 in)
Localities around Ravensthorpe
Mount Madden	Mount Madden	Munglinup
West River	Ravensthorpe	Munglinup
Fitzgerald River NP	Hopetoun	Jerdacuttup

Ravensthorpe is a town 541 kilometres (336 mi) south-east of Perth and 40 kilometres (25 mi) inland from the south coast of Western Australia. It is the seat of government of the Shire of Ravensthorpe. At the 2021 census, Ravensthorpe Shire had a population of 2,085. The town had a population of 350.

In 1848, the area was surveyed by Surveyor General John Septimus Roe who named many of the geographical features nearby, including the Ravensthorpe Range that the town was named after.

There was one of the Western Australian Government Railways isolated branch lines between Hopetoun and Ravensthorpe. This line, the Hopetoun to Ravensthorpe railway line, opened in 1909.

Alluvial gold was discovered at the Phillips River in 1892. At the goldfield a de facto town emerged, known as Phillips River. The government completed construction of a copper and gold smelter about 2 kilometres (1.2 mi) south east of the town in 1906, used to cast copper and gold ingots.

== History ==
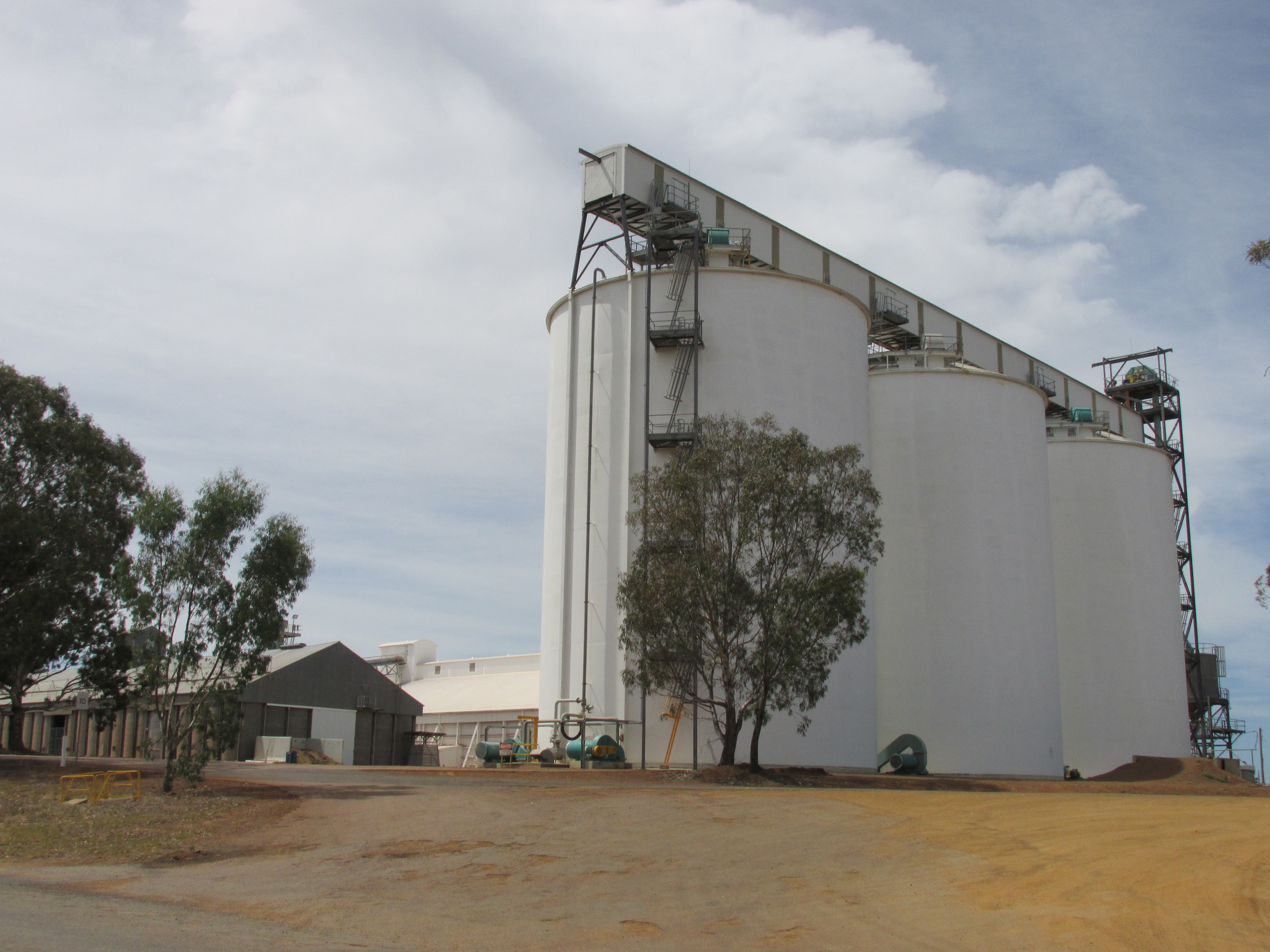
Ravensthorpe grain receival facility

A temporary pastoral lease (called Free Run) was registered by James Dunn senior in 1868. His five sons and daughter started sheep farming at the property, called Cocanarup and located 20 kilometres (12 mi) west of the present town, in 1871, after George and John Dunn drove a herd from Albany. In 1873 the family was granted a permanent lease of 4,049 hectares (10,010 acres).

The region is infamous for the Ravensthorpe Massacre, also called the Cocanarup Massacre, where many Noongar people were massacred in revenge for the fatal spearing of John Dunn in 1880. Dunn had allegedly raped a 13 year old Noongar girl.

By 1901, the population had climbed to over 1,000 and the government gazetted the town, renaming it Ravensthorpe. The area continued to prosper and the population grew accordingly, by 1909 the population was over 3,000. The prosperity was short-lived; World War I took its toll on the town and by 1918 the local copper smelter had closed and many of the copper and gold mines had closed. The population of the town in 1968 was approximately 800 people. Ravensthorpe Airport opened in 2004.

== Agriculture ==
After the war Ravensthorpe survived servicing the farming in the district. Agriculture in the area began to grow following the Great Depression and pastoral land releases occurred in the 1960s and 1970s. The surrounding areas produce wheat and other cereal crops. The town is a receival site for Cooperative Bulk Handling. A bulk wheat bin was constructed in the town in 1947 capable of holding over 1.1 megalitres (30,000 imperial bushels).

== Mining ==
=== Nickel ===
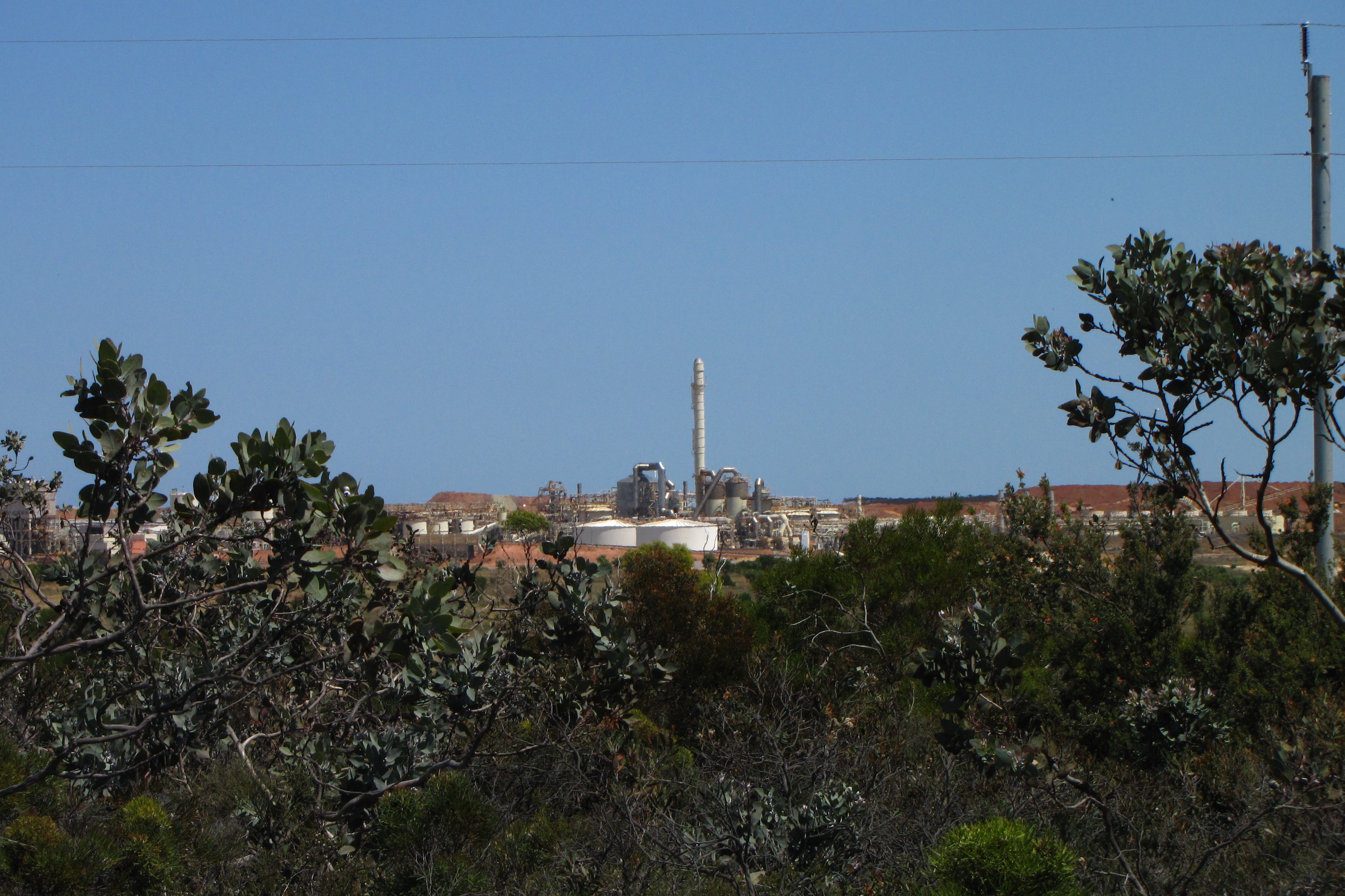
Ravensthorpe Nickel Mine

BHP Billiton commenced a feasibility study in 2002 into opening a nickel and cobalt mine and processing plant 35 kilometres (22 mi) east of the town. The project was approved in 2004 and construction commenced shortly afterward. The plant known as the Ravensthorpe Nickel Project was commissioned in late 2007 with first production occurring in October and the first 5,000 tonnes (11 million pounds) being produced by December 2007. The plant was officially opened in 2008.

In January 2009, BHP Billiton announced that it was suspending production at the Ravensthorpe nickel mine indefinitely, due to the reduction in world nickel prices caused by the global economic crisis. The decision cut 1,800 jobs and had a major impact on the local economy.

On 9 December 2009, BHP sold the Ravensthorpe mine, which it had spent A$2.4 billion to build, to Toronto-based First Quantum Minerals for US$340 million. First Quantum was one of three bidders for the mine and actually produced the lowest offer. The Canadian company planned to have the mine back in production in mid-2011. In 2017 the mine was put into care and maintenance due to low nickel prices. Production resumed in January 2020 with First Quantum Minerals selling a 30% shareholding in the mine to POSCO in May 2021. In April 2024, it was announced the mine would once again be placed into care and maintenance, due to falling nickel prices.

=== Lithium ===
The Mount Cattlin mine is a spodumene-tantalite mine 2.2 kilometres (1.4 mi) north of the town. It was operated by Galaxy Resources between 2009 and 2012 before being placed on care-and-maintenance in 2013. Mine production restarted on 31 March 2016. In January 2017 the first shipment of 10,000 tonnes (22 million pounds) of lithium concentrate was consigned from Esperance to Lianyungang, China. Mount Cattlin mine was placed into care and maintenance in July 2025.

=== Copper ===
The Ravensthorpe Copper Mine operated in the area in the 1960s. In 1967 the mine produced 3,276 tonnes (7.2 million pounds) of copper concentrate averaging about 23% copper. The concentrate was trucked to the port of Esperance for shipment to Japan.

== Climate ==
Ravensthorpe has a semi-arid climate (BSk) with a Mediterranean rainfall pattern.

Climate data for Ravensthorpe
Month	Jan	Feb	Mar	Apr	May	Jun	Jul	Aug	Sep	Oct	Nov	Dec	Year
Record high °C (°F)	45.4 (113.7)	46.0 (114.8)	41.6 (106.9)	38.2 (100.8)	33.9 (93.0)	27.0 (80.6)	26.1 (79.0)	31.0 (87.8)	33.0 (91.4)	38.1 (100.6)	42.1 (107.8)	43.3 (109.9)	46.0 (114.8)
Mean daily maximum °C (°F)	28.9 (84.0)	28.4 (83.1)	26.6 (79.9)	23.7 (74.7)	20.1 (68.2)	17.3 (63.1)	16.4 (61.5)	17.4 (63.3)	19.7 (67.5)	22.5 (72.5)	24.9 (76.8)	27.4 (81.3)	22.8 (73.0)
Mean daily minimum °C (°F)	14.2 (57.6)	14.7 (58.5)	13.7 (56.7)	11.9 (53.4)	9.6 (49.3)	7.9 (46.2)	6.8 (44.2)	6.7 (44.1)	7.5 (45.5)	9.1 (48.4)	11.0 (51.8)	12.8 (55.0)	10.5 (50.9)
Record low °C (°F)	5.9 (42.6)	5.6 (42.1)	3.3 (37.9)	3.3 (37.9)	1.3 (34.3)	−0.5 (31.1)	−1.0 (30.2)	−0.1 (31.8)	0.0 (32.0)	1.2 (34.2)	2.1 (35.8)	4.3 (39.7)	−1.0 (30.2)
Average precipitation mm (inches)	23.9 (0.94)	26.1 (1.03)	32.5 (1.28)	32.1 (1.26)	43.3 (1.70)	43.2 (1.70)	46.4 (1.83)	45.6 (1.80)	41.3 (1.63)	38.0 (1.50)	30.4 (1.20)	23.3 (0.92)	425.7 (16.76)
Average precipitation days	5.8	6.0	7.8	8.3	10.8	12.3	13.2	13.0	11.4	9.9	7.7	6.0	112.2
Average afternoon relative humidity (%)	47	48	49	51	56	60	58	56	51	48	47	45	51
