= Eucalyptus sinuosa =

Octopus mallee

Conservation status
- Priority Two — Poorly Known Taxa (DEC)

Scientific classification
- Kingdom: Plantae
- Clade: Tracheophytes
- Clade: Angiosperms
- Clade: Eudicots
- Clade: Rosids
- Order: Myrtales
- Family: Myrtaceae
- Genus: Eucalyptus
- Species: E. sinuosa

Binomial name
- Eucalyptus sinuosa D.Nicolle, M.E.French & McQuoid

Species of eucalyptus

Eucalyptus sinuosa, commonly known as octopus mallee, is a species of mallee that is endemic to Western Australia. It has smooth bark, linear leaves, flower buds fused together in clusters of between eleven and twenty-five, greenish yellow flowers and fruit that are fused into a woody mass.

== Description ==
Eucalyptus sinuosa is a mallee that typically grows to a height of 4 m (13 ft) and forms a lignotuber. The bark is smooth, cream-coloured, grey to grey-brown and orange-brown and is shed in strips and short ribbons. The adult leaves are arranged alternately, the same glossy green on both sides, linear, 50–75 mm (2.0–3.0 in) long and 4–7 mm (0.16–0.28 in) wide with the base tapering to a petiole 2–5 mm (0.079–0.197 in) long. The flower buds are arranged in leaf axils in fused clusters of between eleven and twenty-five on an unbranched peduncle 45–100 mm (1.8–3.9 in) long and downturned at flowering time. Only the upper part of each bud is free and has a long, sinuous operculum with a swelling at the tip. Flowering occurs between December and April and the flowers are yellow-green. The fruit are fused into a woody mass 25–75 mm (0.98–2.95 in) in diameter, including the strongly protruding valves.

== Taxonomy ==
Eucalyptus sinuosa was first formally described in 2008 by the botanists Dean Nicolle, Malcolm French and Nathan McQuoid in the journal Nuytsia. The name E. petila had previously been used for this species but is not a valid name as no Latin description or diagnosis had been published for it. The specific epithet is from the Latin word sinuosus meaning "full of bends" or "winding", in reference to the long bendy inner operculum of the mature flower buds.

== Distribution ==
The octopus mallee is found in about six scattered populations along the south coast of Western Australia between Ongerup, Jerramungup and the lower West River catchment in the Fitzgerald River National Park. Although the populations are widely scattered, the species is often common or dominant where it occurs.

== Conservation status ==
This mallee is classified as "Priority Two" by the Western Australian Government Department of Parks and Wildlife meaning that it is poorly known and known from only one or a few locations.

== See also ==
- List of Eucalyptus species
