= List of State Register of Heritage Places in the Shire of Jerramungup =

List of heritage sites in Western Australia

The State Register of Heritage Places is maintained by the Heritage Council of Western Australia. As of 2026, 17 places are heritage-listed in the Shire of Jerramungup, of which three are on the State Register of Heritage Places.

== List ==
=== State Register of Heritage Places ===
The Western Australian State Register of Heritage Places, as of 2026, lists the following three state registered places within the Shire of Jerramungup:

| Place name | Place # | Street number | Street name | Suburb or town | Co-ordinates | Notes & former names | Photo |
|---|---|---|---|---|---|---|---|
| Quaalup Homestead Group | 1249 | | Fitzgerald River National Park, off Devils Creek Road | Bremer Bay | 34.259881°S 119.410274°E | | |
| Wellsteads' Homestead Group | 11969 | | Wellstead Road, Point Henry Peninsula | Bremer Bay | 34.435073°S 119.363032°E | Mount Joy, Wellstead's Station, Peppermint Grove | |
| Original Wellstead Home | 23982 | | Wellstead Road, Point Henry Peninsula | Bremer Bay | 34.435045°S 119.363159°E | Part of Wellsteads' Homestead Group | |

=== Shire of Jerramungup heritage-listed places ===
The following places are heritage listed in the Shire of Jerramungup but are not State registered:

| Place name | Place # | Street number | Street name | Suburb or town | Notes & former names | Photo |
|---|---|---|---|---|---|---|
| Jerramungup Homestead and Barn (former) | 1247 | 72 | Cameron Road | Jerramungup | Hassell Homestead and Barn | |
| Telegraph Station (former) | 1248 | | Borden-Bremer Bay Road | Bremer Bay | Bremer Bay Telegraph Station | |
| Rabbit Proof Fence No 2 and No 3 | 5022 | | | Northampton to Ravensthorpe | Emu Barrier Fence | |
| Bark Hut | 11697 | | The Esplanade | Bremer Bay | | |
| Jerramungup School | 11699 | Corner | Lancaster & Memorial Roads | Jerramungup | | |
| Shire of Jerramungup Council Offices | 11700 | | Vasey Street | Jerramungup | | |
| Jerramungup Town Hall | 11701 | | Memorial Road | Jerramungup | | |
| C Cameron's Office (former) | 11702 | | Memorial Road | Jerramungup | Landcare Office | |
| Jerramungup Powerhouse | 11703 | | Tobruk Road | Jerramungup | | |
| Jerramungup War Memorial | 12873 | | Memorial Road | Jerramungup | | |
| Manse | 15082 | 8 | Lancaster Road | Jerramungup | | |
| Fitzgerald River National Park (1989 Boundary) | 16719 | | 2 km North of | Bremer Bay | | |
| Jerramungup Police Station | 18995 | | Vasey Street | Jerramungup | | |
| Doubtful Island Shacks, Jerramungup | 27048 | | Gordon Inlet Road | Jerramungup | | |
