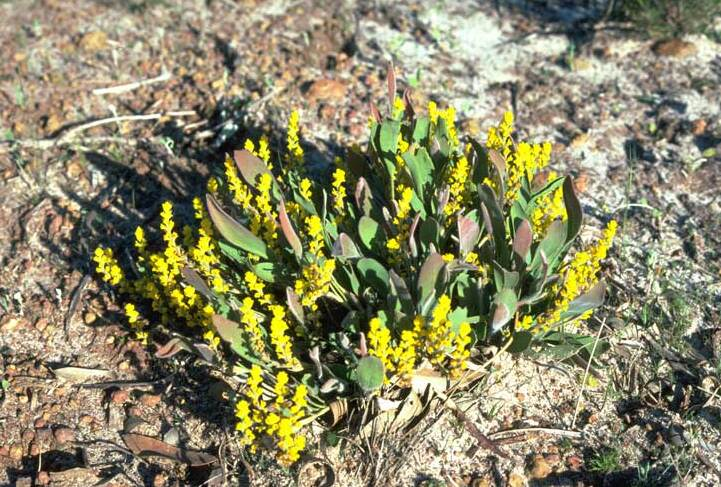
- Near Donnybrook

Scientific classification
- Kingdom: Plantae
- Clade: Embryophytes
- Clade: Tracheophytes
- Clade: Spermatophytes
- Clade: Angiosperms
- Clade: Eudicots
- Order: Proteales
- Family: Proteaceae
- Genus: Synaphea
- Species: S. reticulata

Binomial name
- Synaphea reticulata (Sm.) Druce

= Synaphea reticulata =

Species of Australian shrub in the family Proteaceae

Synaphea reticulata is a species of flowering plant in the family Proteaceae and is endemic to the south of Western Australia. It is a spreading to prostrate shrub with wedge-shaped, sometimes flat to wavy or three-lobed leaves, and spikes of yellow flowers.

== Description ==
Synaphea reticulata is a spreading to prostrate shrub with low-lying stems up to 13 cm (5.1 in) long sparsely branches and covered with soft hairs. The leaves are wedge-shaped, more or less flat to wavy or three-part, 50–100 mm (2.0–3.9 in) long and 10–40 mm (0.39–1.57 in) wide on a petiole 20–70 mm (0.79–2.76 in) long. The lobed leaves sometimes have one or two further wavy lobes.

The flowers are yellow and borne in spikes up to 50 mm (2.0 in) long, the flowers openly spaced on a simple or openly branched, hairy peduncle 10–40 mm (0.39–1.57 in) long. The bracts are egg-shaped, 2.5–3.0 mm (0.098–0.118 in) long and shaggy hairy. The perianth is ascending and has a moderately wide opening, the upper tepal 5.0–7.2 mm (0.20–0.28 in) long and 3.0–3.2 mm (0.12–0.13 in) wide wth flared edges, the lower tepal 4.5–5.8 mm (0.18–0.23 in) long. The stigma is oblong with two horns, 1.5–2.0 mm (0.059–0.079 in) long and 1.2 mm (0.047 in) wide and concave. The ovary is covered with shaggy hairs. Flowering occurs in September and October, and the fruit is elliptic, 3.5–4.0 mm (0.14–0.16 in) long and hairy.

== Taxonomy ==
This species was first formally described in 1808 by James Edward Smith who gave it the name Conospermum reticulatum in Abraham Rees The Cyclopaedia from specimens collected by Archibald Menzies at King George's Sound. In 1917, George Claridge Druce transferred the species to Synaphea as S. reticulata. The specific epithet (reticulata) means reticulate, referring to the net-like appearance of the leaf veins.

== Distribution and habitat ==
Synaphea reticulata grows in sandy soils over granite or limestone, mainly between Albany and the Fitzgerald River National Park, but also in the Stirling Range and near Jerramungup in the Avon Wheatbelt, Esperance Plains, Jarrah Forest, Mallee and Warren bioregions of southern Western Australia.

== Conservation status ==
Synaphea reticulata is listed as 'not threatened' by the Western Australian Government Department of Biodiversity, Conservation and Attractions.
