= West Fitzgerald, Western Australia =

Locality in the Shire of Jerramungup, Western Australia

West Fitzgerald
- other
- Coordinates: 33.65639°S 119.38360°E
- Country: Australia
- State: Western Australia
- LGA(s): Shire of Jerramungup
- Location: 381 km (237 mi) SE of Perth; 201 km (125 mi) NE of Albany; 49 km (30 mi) NE of Jerramungup

Government
  - State electorate(s): Roe
  - Federal division(s): O'Connor

Area
  - Total: 657.6 km^{2} (253.9 sq mi)

Population
  - Total(s): 20 (SAL 2021)
- Postcode: 6337
Localities around West Fitzgerald
Magenta	West River	West River
Pingrup	West Fitzgerald	West River
Jacup	Fitzgerald River NP	Fitzgerald River NP

West Fitzgerald is a rural locality of the Shire of Jerramungup in the Great Southern region of Western Australia. The South Coast Highway passes through the locality from west to east while its far south is made up of a part of the Fitzgerald River National Park.

The majority of the Shire of Jerramungup is located on the traditional land of the Koreng people of the Noongar nation. During the early days of European settlement, the Wudjari people, also of the Noongar nation, moved into the eastern parts of what is now the Shire of Jerramungup, where West Fitzgerald is located.

Just over West Fitzgerald's eastern border, between West Fitzgerald and West River and the Shire of Ravensthorpe, lies the townsite of Fitzgerald, which was gazetted in 1967 to service the surrounding agricultural area.
