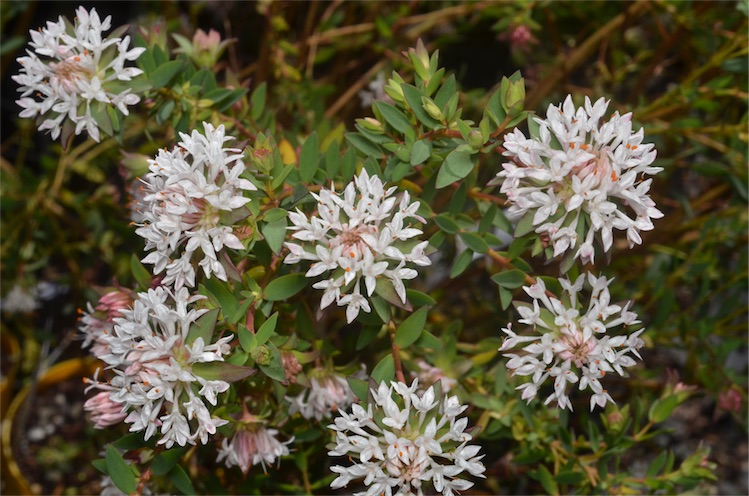

Scientific classification
- Kingdom: Plantae
- Clade: Tracheophytes
- Clade: Angiosperms
- Clade: Eudicots
- Clade: Rosids
- Order: Malvales
- Family: Thymelaeaceae
- Genus: Pimelea
- Species: P. sylvestris

Binomial name
- Pimelea sylvestris R.Br.

Synonyms
- Banksia sylvestris (R.Br.) Kuntze; Calyptrostegia graciliflora (Hook.) Endl.; Calyptrostegia sylvestris (R.Br.) C.A.Mey.; Pimelea graciliflora Hook.; Pimelea sylvestris R.Br. var. sylvestris

= Pimelea sylvestris =

Species of shrub

Pimelea sylvestris is a species of flowering plant in the family Thymelaeaceae and is endemic to the south-west of Western Australia. It is an erect shrub with narrowly elliptic to elliptic leaves arranged in opposite pairs, and compact heads of white or pink flowers surrounded by 2 or 4 pairs of narrowly egg-shaped involucral bracts.

== Description ==
Pimelea sylvestris is an erect shrub that typically grows to a height of 0.3–2 m (1 ft 0 in – 6 ft 7 in) and has glabrous stems. The leaves are arranged in opposite pairs, narrowly elliptic or elliptic, 12–45 mm (0.47–1.77 in) long and 2.5–20 mm (0.098–0.787 in) wide on a short petiole. Both surfaces of the leaves are glabrous, the lower surface sometimes a paler shade of green. The flowers are bisexual, glabrous, white or pink and arranged in erect, compact heads, surrounded by 2 or 4 pairs of narrowly egg-shaped medium green, involucral bracts 8–22 mm (0.31–0.87 in) long and 2–10 mm (0.079–0.394 in) wide. Each flower is on a densely hairy pedicel 0.5–0.8 mm (0.020–0.031 in) long. The flower tube is 7–14 mm (0.28–0.55 in) long, the sepals 2.5–6 mm (0.098–0.236 in) long, the stamens longer than the sepals. Flowering mainly occurs from September to December.

== Taxonomy ==
Pimelea sylvestris was first formally described in 1810 by Robert Brown in his Prodromus Florae Novae Hollandiae et Insulae Van Diemen. The specific epithet (sylvestris) means "pertaining to woods" or "growing wild".

== Distribution and habitat ==
This pimelea grows in woodland and forest, sometimes in coastal scrub, and occurs between Jurien Bay and West Mount Barren in the Avon Wheatbelt, Esperance Plains, Jarrah Forest, Swan Coastal Plain and Warren bioregions of south-western Western Australia.

== Conservation status ==
Pimelea sylvestris is listed as "not threatened" by the Government of Western Australia Department of Biodiversity, Conservation and Attractions.
