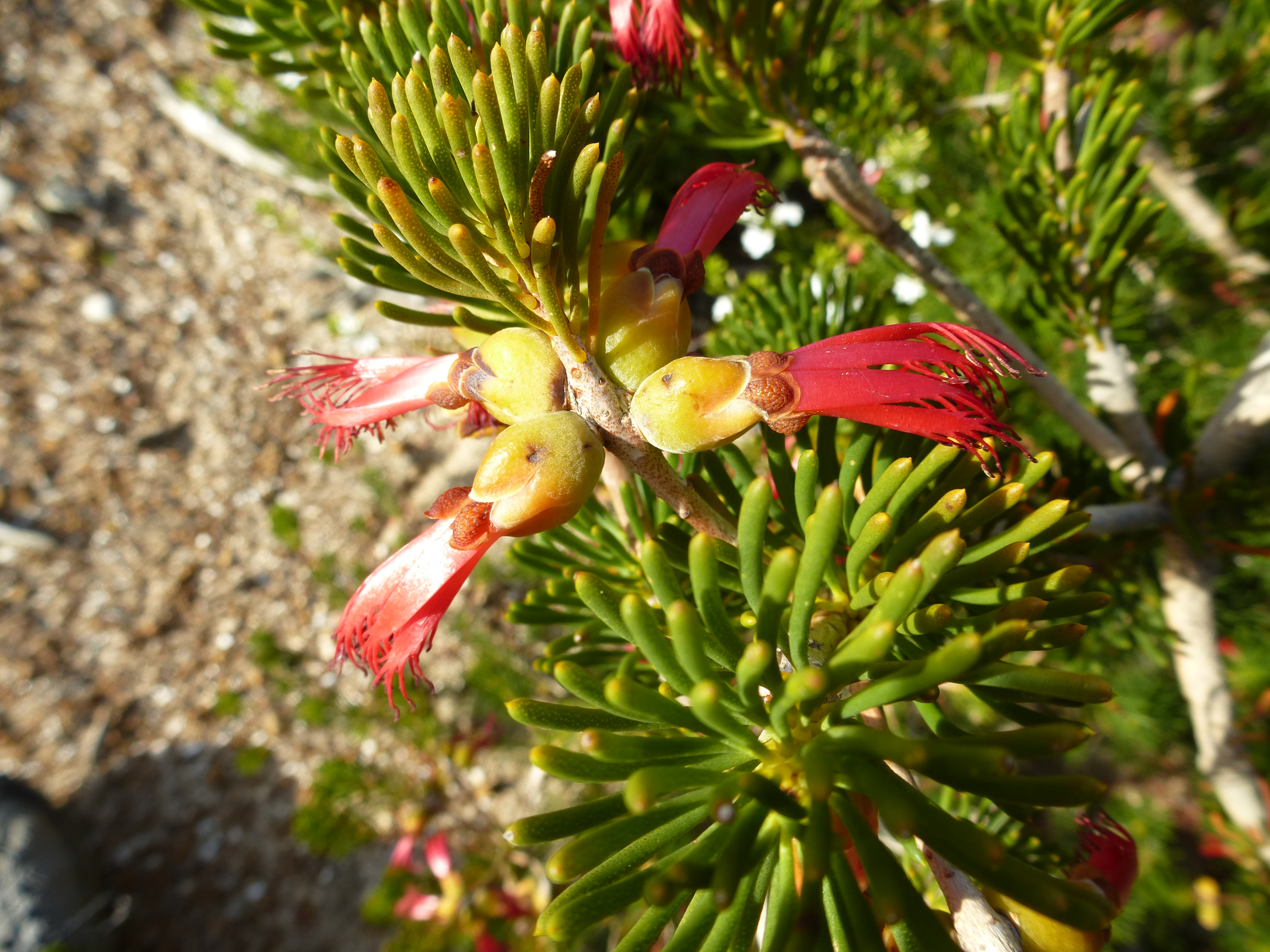
- Near East Mount Barren

Scientific classification
- Kingdom: Plantae
- Clade: Tracheophytes
- Clade: Angiosperms
- Clade: Eudicots
- Clade: Rosids
- Order: Myrtales
- Family: Myrtaceae
- Genus: Calothamnus
- Species: C. validus

Binomial name
- Calothamnus validus S.Moore

Synonyms
- Melaleuca valida (S.Moore) Craven & R.D.Edwards

= Calothamnus validus =

Barrens clawflower

Species of flowering plant

Calothamnus validus, commonly known as Barrens clawflower, is a plant in the myrtle family, Myrtaceae and is endemic to the south-west of Western Australia. It is an upright or rounded shrub with stiff, cylindrical but not sharply pointed leaves and red, 4-part flowers. The common name derives from the location, West Mount Barren, where it was found by Spencer Moore, the author of its formal description. It is commonly cultivated and has sometimes escaped from gardens in Western Australia.

== Description ==
Calothamnus validus grows to about 3 metres (9.8 ft) tall and has leaves that are about 20–40 millimetres (0.8–2 in) long. The leaves are circular in cross section and taper to a point but are not prickly.

The flowers are red and arranged in small clusters about 50 millimetres (2 in) long, containing usually 2 to 4 flowers. They have 4 petals and 4 claw-like bundles of stamens, all narrow and about the same length. Unlike some others in the genus, the flowers and fruit are never buried in corky bark. Flowering occurs from July to November and is followed by fruits which are woody capsules. The fruiting capsules have two prominently thickened, curved lobes.

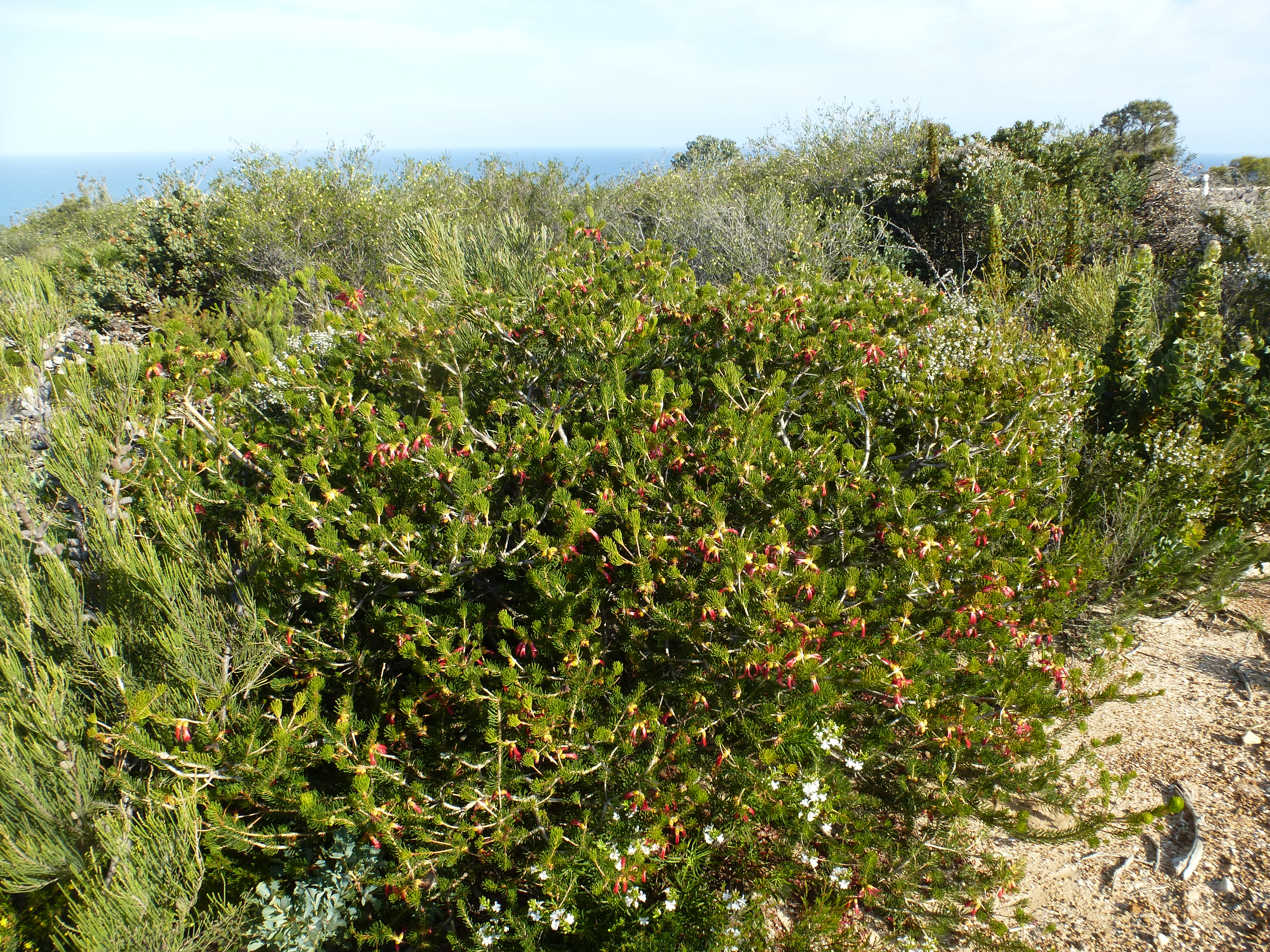
Habit

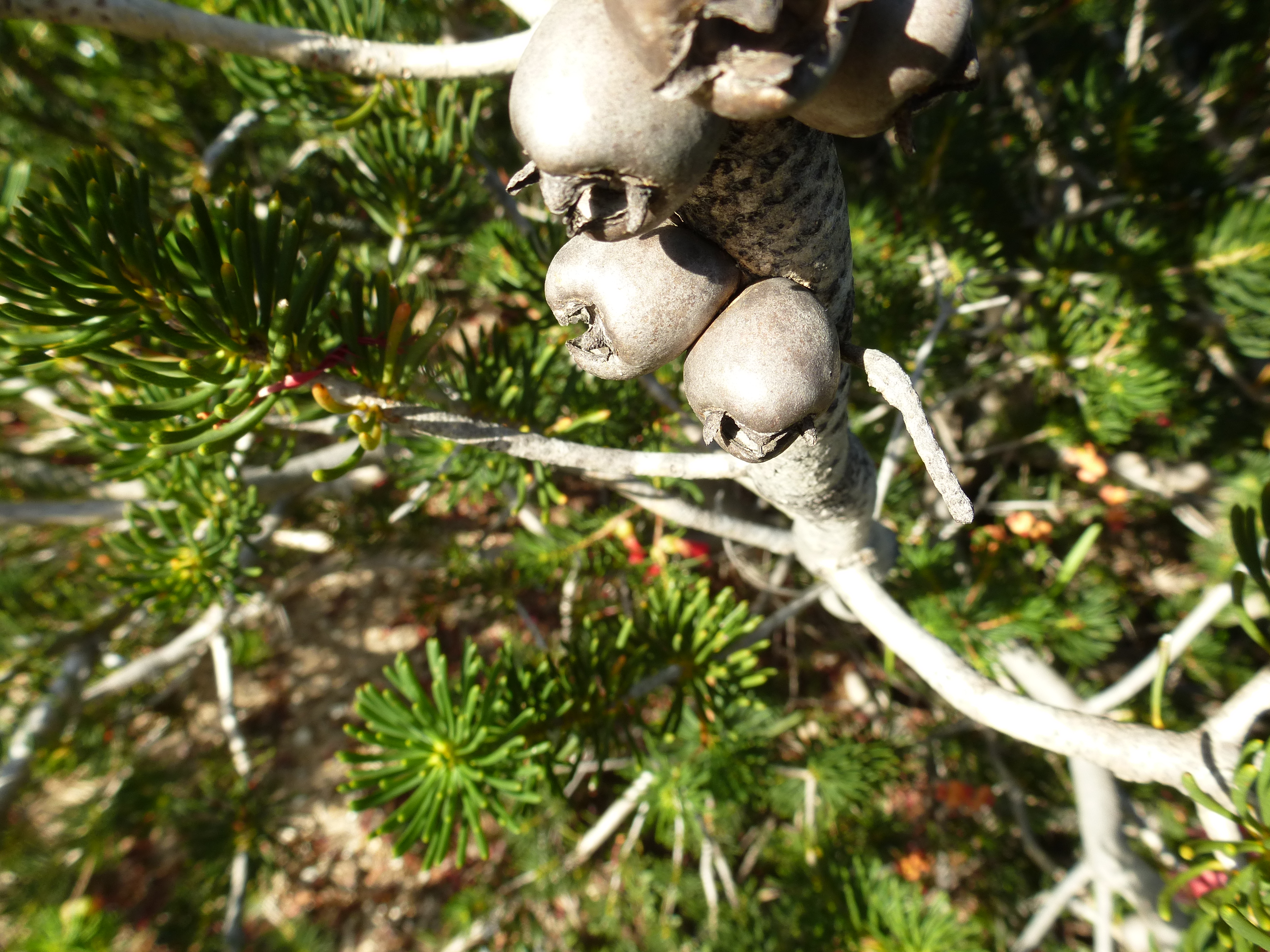
Fruits

== Taxonomy and naming ==
Calothamnus validus was first formally described by Spencer Moore in 1920 in Journal of the Linnean Society, Botany from a specimen collected " in a rocky creek near West Mt. Barren". The specific epithet validus is a Latin word meaning "strong", "sound" or "powerful".

== Distribution and habitat ==
Calothamnus validus occurs in the Barren Mountains in the Fitzgerald River National Park in the Esperance Plains biogeographic regions. It grows in rocky quartzite in kwongan.

== Ecology ==
This species, Calothamnus quadrifidus and others have been used in revegetation projects and in roadside plantings and both have escaped from cultivation.

== Conservation ==
Calothamnus validus is classified as "not threatened" by the Western Australian government department of parks and wildlife.
