= Jacup, Western Australia =

Locality in the Shire of Jerramungup, Western Australia

Jacup
- Interactive map of Jacup
- Coordinates: 33.84675°S 119.20441°E
- Country: Australia
- State: Western Australia
- LGA: Shire of Jerramungup
- Location: 373 km (232 mi) SE of Perth; 180 km (110 mi) NE of Albany; 27 km (17 mi) NE of Jerramungup

Government
  - State electorate: Roe
  - Federal division: O'Connor

Area
  - Total: 696.9 km^{2} (269.1 sq mi)
- Elevation: 305 m (1,001 ft)

Population
  - Total: 71 (SAL 2021)
- Postcode: 6337
- Mean max temp: 22.2 °C (72.0 °F)
- Mean min temp: 9.3 °C (48.7 °F)
- Annual rainfall: 435.7 mm (17.15 in)
Localities around Jacup
Pingrup	Pingrup	West Fitzgerald
Jerramungup	Jacup	West Fitzgerald
Jerramungup	Fitzgerald River NP	Fitzgerald River NP

Jacup is a rural locality of the Shire of Jerramungup in the Great Southern region of Western Australia. The South Coast Highway passes through the locality from west to east while the Fitzgerald River runs through it from north to south. The far south of Jacup is made up of a part of the Fitzgerald River National Park while, in the far north, a small section of the Lake Magenta Nature Reserve protrudes into Jacup.

The majority of the Shire of Jerramungup is located on the traditional land of the Koreng people of the Noongar nation. During the early days of European settlement, the Wudjari people, also of the Noongar nation, moved into the eastern parts of what is now the Shire of Jerramungup, where Jacup is located.

Sections of the No.2 Rabbit-proof fence run along the western border of Jacup, with the road just north of the South Coast Highway still bearing the name Rabbit Proof Fence Road.

== Geography ==
=== Climate ===
Jacup has a semi-arid climate (Köppen: BSk) with characteristics of a mediterranean climate; with warm, dry summers and mild, slightly wetter winters. Extreme temperatures ranged from 46.1 °C (115.0 °F) on 6 January 2010 to −2.0 °C (28.4 °F) on 11 September 2004. The wettest recorded day was 13 January 2006 with 66.8 mm (2.63 in) of rainfall.

Climate data for Jacup (33.89°S 119.11°E) (305 m (1,001 ft) AMSL) (1993-2025)
Month	Jan	Feb	Mar	Apr	May	Jun	Jul	Aug	Sep	Oct	Nov	Dec	Year
Record high °C (°F)	46.1 (115.0)	45.0 (113.0)	41.0 (105.8)	36.7 (98.1)	31.6 (88.9)	26.0 (78.8)	27.6 (81.7)	29.6 (85.3)	33.1 (91.6)	37.4 (99.3)	41.1 (106.0)	43.8 (110.8)	46.1 (115.0)
Mean daily maximum °C (°F)	28.0 (82.4)	27.8 (82.0)	25.9 (78.6)	22.9 (73.2)	19.8 (67.6)	16.8 (62.2)	15.8 (60.4)	16.9 (62.4)	19.2 (66.6)	22.1 (71.8)	24.6 (76.3)	26.5 (79.7)	22.2 (71.9)
Mean daily minimum °C (°F)	13.1 (55.6)	13.7 (56.7)	12.7 (54.9)	10.8 (51.4)	8.4 (47.1)	6.6 (43.9)	5.7 (42.3)	5.7 (42.3)	6.3 (43.3)	7.8 (46.0)	9.8 (49.6)	11.5 (52.7)	9.3 (48.8)
Record low °C (°F)	3.2 (37.8)	5.1 (41.2)	4.0 (39.2)	1.7 (35.1)	1.2 (34.2)	−0.4 (31.3)	−0.4 (31.3)	−1.2 (29.8)	−2.0 (28.4)	−0.2 (31.6)	0.0 (32.0)	1.3 (34.3)	−2.0 (28.4)
Average precipitation mm (inches)	27.1 (1.07)	20.3 (0.80)	32.0 (1.26)	40.0 (1.57)	33.0 (1.30)	44.8 (1.76)	52.7 (2.07)	53.2 (2.09)	40.9 (1.61)	38.1 (1.50)	29.1 (1.15)	24.6 (0.97)	435.7 (17.15)
Average precipitation days (≥ 0.2 mm)	6.4	6.1	8.6	11.3	12.5	15.9	18.6	18.6	14.3	10.9	8.5	6.6	138.3
Average afternoon relative humidity (%)	48	45	46	50	51	57	59	59	53	50	45	45	51
Average dew point °C (°F)	11.7 (53.1)	11.2 (52.2)	10.0 (50.0)	9.4 (48.9)	7.3 (45.1)	6.3 (43.3)	5.7 (42.3)	6.6 (43.9)	6.3 (43.3)	7.2 (45.0)	8.3 (46.9)	9.5 (49.1)	8.3 (46.9)
Source: Bureau of Meteorology (1993-2025)
