= West Mount Barren =

Mountain in Western Australia

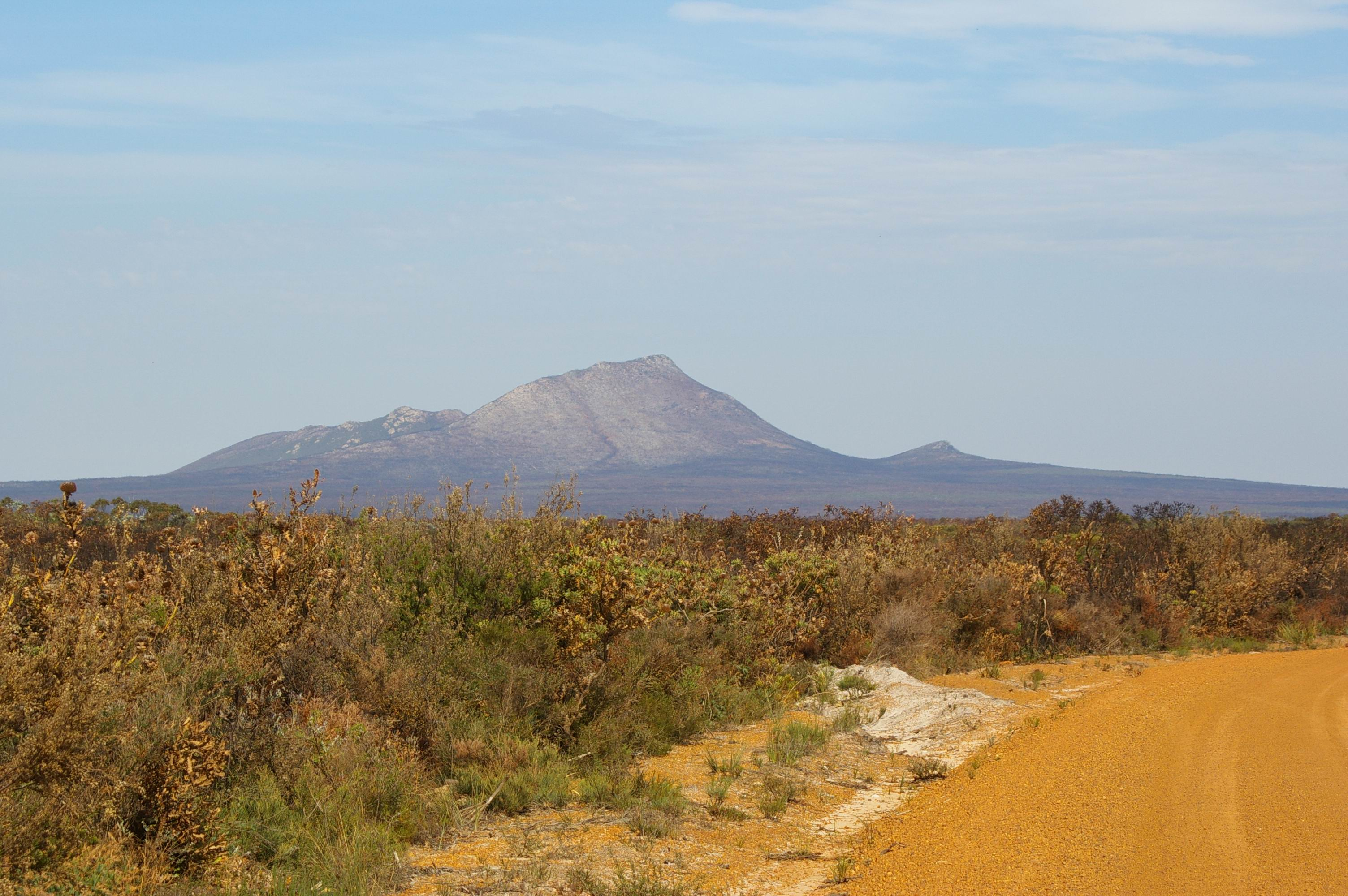

Highest point
- Elevation: 372 m (1,220 ft)
- Coordinates: 34°12′59″S 119°25′58″E

Geography
- Location within Western Australia
- Location: Goldfields-Esperance of Western Australia
- Parent range: Barrens Range

West Mount Barren is part of the Fitzgerald River National Park located between Bremer Bay and Hopetoun on the south coast of Western Australia. The coordinates of the summit of West Mount Barren are 34°12′59″S 119°25′58″E.

West Mount Barren, along with East Mount Barren and Mid-Mount Barren were all named by Matthew Flinders in 1802 after their barren appearance.

== Description ==
West Mount Barren rises 372 metres above sea level and forms part of the Barren Range within the national park. Mount Bland (320 metres) is the closest mountain feature and is situated approximately 5 km northeast from West Mount Barren. The Barren range is not continuous and although there are three distinct Mount Barrens (West, Mid and East) they are distinct peaks that are connected by coastal plain. Mid Mount Barren is approximately 20 km northeast of West Mount Barren and East Mount Barren is approximately 50 km northeast of West Mount Barren. Other peaks in the area include Woolbernup Hill, Thumb Peak, Mt Drummond and Mt Maxwell.

West Mount Barren is accessible by an unsealed road suitable for 2WD vehicles that runs off Pabelup Drive. A carpark with a plaque at the base of the mountain marks the beginning of a track that is an easy two hour return walk to the summit. Visitors are encouraged to stay on the footpath so as to minimise the spread of dieback which is a threat to the native plants of the area.

A commanding view of the national park and the coastline is seen from the summit.

== Geology ==
The Ravensthorpe region is underlain by basement rocks of the Albany-Fraser Orogen and Yilgarn craton. These rocks consist of granite, gneiss and minor enclaves of sedimentary and volcanic rocks. The Barren Ranges consist of metasediments, mostly folded and faulted quartzite, phyllite, dolomite and conglomerate. The Barrens are composed of rock beds that have been tilted and folded. These rock beds were once layers of sand deposited on the sea floor. They were subsequently compressed, heated and uplifted by movements of the Earth's crust.

== Botany ==
The vegetation surrounding West Mount Barren is best described as scrub-heath with many types of shrubs that thrive in the quartzitic or lateritic sand, often in rocky situations. The shrubs are mostly Proteaceae and Myrtaceae.

Several species are unique to the area and can be found on and around West Mount Barren. Species include royal hakea (Hakea victoria), Qualup bell (Pimelea physodes), oval-leaf adenanthos (Adenanthos ellipticus), blue dampiera (Dampiera linearis), silver-leafed Barrens regelia (Regelia velutina), Barrens clawflower (Calothamnus validus), and the broad-leaved brown pea (Bossiaea ornata).

== Fires ==
The area around West Mount Barren is often burnt out by bush fires. Lightning strikes are the most usual cause of fires that often devastate large areas of the park. The last large scale fire was in December 2006 where four fires, that were started by lightning strikes, joined into one much larger blaze that burned out several thousand hectares of bushland.
