= Electoral results for the district of Plantagenet =

Western Australian district election results

This is a list of electoral results for the Electoral district of Plantagenet in Western Australian state elections.

== Members for Plantagenet ==
Member	Party	Term
Albert Hassell	Ministerial	1890–1901
Albert Hassell	Opposition	1901–1904

== Election results ==
=== Elections in the 1900s ===
1901 Western Australian state election: Plantagenet
Party	Candidate	Votes	%	±%
Opposition	Albert Hassell	346	53.9	–46.1
Labour	Alfred Mather	296	46.1	+46.1
Total formal votes		642	98.1	n/a
Informal votes		6	1.9	n/a
Turnout		308	39.1	n/a
Opposition hold		Swing	N/A	

=== Elections in the 1890s ===
1897 Western Australian colonial election: Plantagenet
Party	Candidate	Votes	%	±%
Ministerialist	Albert Hassell	unopposed		
Ministerialist hold		Swing		

1894 Western Australian colonial election: Plantagenet
Party	Candidate	Votes	%	±%
None	Albert Hassell	unopposed		

1890 Western Australian colonial election: Plantagenet
Party	Candidate	Votes	%	±%
None	Albert Hassell	60	72.3	n/a
None	Andrew Dempster	23	27.7	n/a
