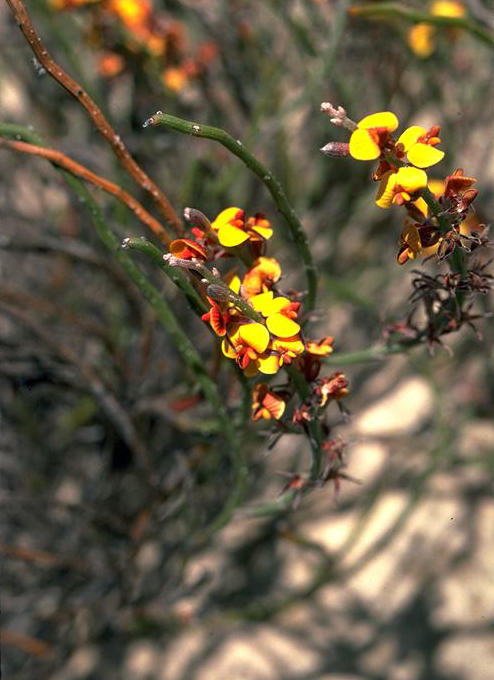
- Near Cape Arid National Park

Scientific classification
- Kingdom: Plantae
- Clade: Tracheophytes
- Clade: Angiosperms
- Clade: Eudicots
- Clade: Rosids
- Order: Fabales
- Family: Fabaceae
- Subfamily: Faboideae
- Genus: Jacksonia
- Species: J. venosa

Binomial name
- Jacksonia venosa Chappill

= Jacksonia venosa =

Species of legume

Jacksonia venosa is a species of flowering plant in the family Fabaceae and is endemic to the south of Western Australia. It is a low, spreading, tufted shrub with greyish-green branches, the end branches sharply-pointed cladodes, leaves reduced to dark brown, egg-shaped scales, yellow-orange to orange flowers with red marking scattered along the branches, and membranous, more or less glabrous, flattened pods.

== Description ==
Jacksonia venosa is a low, spreading, tufted shrub that typically grows up to 10–50 cm (3.9–19.7 in) high and 0.15–60 m (5.9 in – 196 ft 10.2 in) wide. It has greyish-green branches, the end branches sharply-pointed cladodes, its leaves reduced to egg-shaped, dark brown scales, 0.8–1.3 mm (0.031–0.051 in) long and 0.7–1 mm (0.028–0.039 in) wide. The flowers are scattered along the branches on pedicels 1.2–1.8 mm (0.047–0.071 in) long, with egg-shaped bracteoles 0.6–1.2 mm (0.024–0.047 in) long and 0.5–0.8 mm (0.020–0.031 in) wide. The floral tube is 0.5–0.8 mm (0.020–0.031 in) long and not ribbed, and the sepals are membranous, the inner surface red, with lobes 4.1–4.5 mm (0.16–0.18 in) long, 0.8–1 mm (0.031–0.039 in) wide and fused for 0.3–0.4 mm (0.012–0.016 in). The standard petal is yellow-orange or orange with red markings on the inner surface, 3.8–4.2 mm (0.15–0.17 in) long and 5.5–7.2 mm (0.22–0.28 in) deep, the wings yellow-orange to orange with red markings, 2.7–3.5 mm (0.11–0.14 in) long, and the keel is dark red, 3.5–3.9 mm (0.14–0.15 in) long. The stamens have pink to red filaments, 2.0–4.1 mm (0.079–0.161 in) long. Flowering occurs from August to January, and the fruit is a membranous, glabrous or sparsely hairy pod about 6.5 mm (0.26 in) long and 2 mm (0.079 in) wide.

== Taxonomy ==
Jacksonia venosa was first formally described in 2007 by Jennifer Anne Chappill in Australian Systematic Botany from specimens collected 37 km (23 mi) east-north-east of Condingup in 1991. The specific epithet (venosa) means 'prominently veined', referring to the dark red veins on the outer surface of the standard petal.

== Distribution and habitat ==
This species of Jacksonia grows in shrubland on sand near the south coast of Western Australia between West River and Israelite Bay in the Esperance Plains and Mallee bioregions.

== Conservation status ==
Jacksonia venosa is listed as "not threatened" by the Government of Western Australia Department of Biodiversity, Conservation and Attractions.
