= John Frederick Tasman Hassell =

Australian politician

The Honourable John Hassell

Member of the Legislative Council of Western Australia
- In office 3 August 1893 – 16 July 1894
- Preceded by: McKenzie Grant
- Succeeded by: None (council reconstituted)
- Constituency: None (nominated by governor)

Member of the Legislative Assembly of Western Australia
- In office 2 August 1900 – 24 April 1901
- Preceded by: George Leake
- Succeeded by: James Gardiner
- Constituency: Albany

Personal details
- Born: 24 June 1839 Launceston, Van Diemen's Land, Australia
- Died: 15 February 1919 (aged 79) Albany, Western Australia, Australia

John Frederick Tasman Hassell (24 June 1839 – 15 February 1919) was an Australian pastoralist and politician who served in both houses of the Parliament of Western Australia. He was a member of the Legislative Council from 1893 to 1894 and later served in the Legislative Assembly from 1900 to 1901.

Hassell was born in Launceston, Tasmania, to Ellen (née Boucher) and John Hassell. His family moved to Albany, Western Australia, when he was an infant, where his younger brother Albert Hassell (who was also a member of parliament) was born. In 1856, Hassell became manager of his father's property at Kendenup. He returned to Albany in 1864 and went into partnership with his brother, establishing a business there. He also worked as an agent for P&O, a steamship company. From 1865 to 1866, Hassell served on the Albany Town Trust. He also served on the Plantagenet Road Board for a period. Hassell entered parliament in August 1893, as a nominee of the governor, Sir William Robinson, to the Legislative Council. He served until July 1894, when the council became fully elective. Hassell re-entered parliament at the 1900 Albany by-election, replacing George Leake (who had resigned) in the seat of Albany. He served only until the 1901 state election, which he did not contest. Hassell died in Albany in 1919, aged 79. He had married Isabella Johanna Morison in 1868, with whom he had five daughters.

Parliament of Western Australia
Preceded by George Leake	Member for Albany; 1900–1901	Succeeded by James Gardiner
