= Fitzgerald, Western Australia =

Locality in the Shire of Ravensthorpe, Western Australia

Fitzgerald
- Town
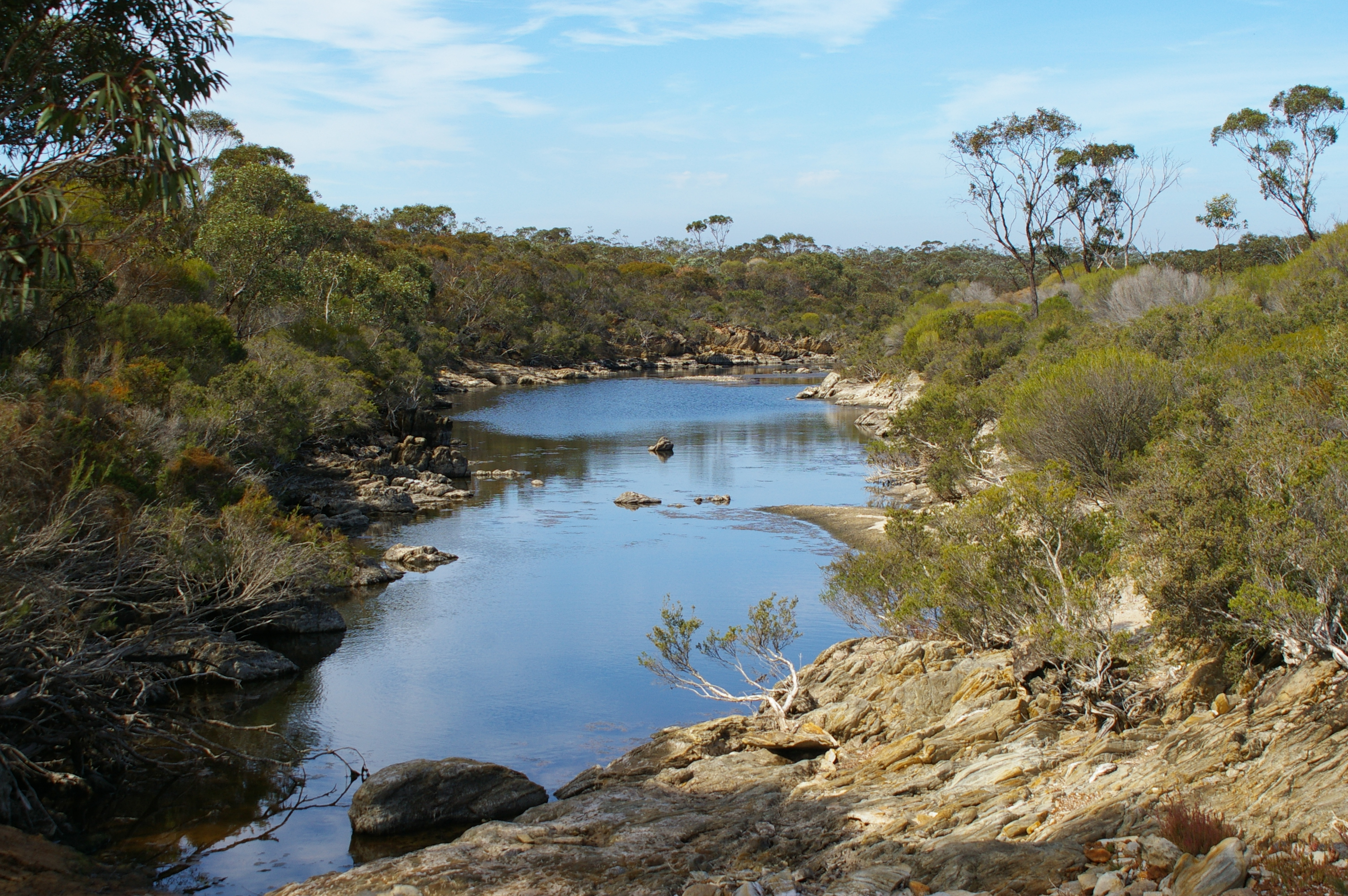
- Fitzgerald River National Park

- Interactive map of Fitzgerald
- Coordinates: 33.74970°S 119.45723°E
- Country: Australia
- State: Western Australia
- LGA: Shire of Ravensthorpe
- Location: 390 km (240 mi) SE of Perth; 83 km (52 mi) S of Newdegate; 58 km (36 mi) W of Ravensthorpe
- Established: 1967

Government
  - State electorate: Roe
  - Federal division: O'Connor

Area
  - Total: 2.87 km^{2} (1.11 sq mi)

Population
  - Total: 0 (SAL 2016)
- Postcode: 6347
Localities around Fitzgerald
West Fitzgerald	West River	West River
West Fitzgerald	Fitzgerald	West River
West River	West River	West River

Fitzgerald is a rural townsite and locality of the Shire of Ravensthorpe in the Goldfields-Esperance region of Western Australia. The townsite lies north of the South Coast Highway.

== History ==
Fitzgerald is located on the traditional land of the Wudjari people of the Noongar nation.

The townsite of Fitzgerald was gazetted in 1967 as a service centre for the surrounding agricultural area, which had been opened up for settlement in the 1950s. A number of names were considered for the new town but Fitzgerald was eventually chosen, based on the name of the nearby river and the surrounding land district.

The Fitzgerald primary schools are listed on the shire's heritage register. The first school opened in February 1966 with twelve pupils, and was replaced by a new school the following year. The second school building burned down in August 1967 and was replaced by a third one of identical design but with gas instead of wood heaters as the latter had caused the fire. The school was eventually closed and the building relocated to Ravensthorpe in 1997.
