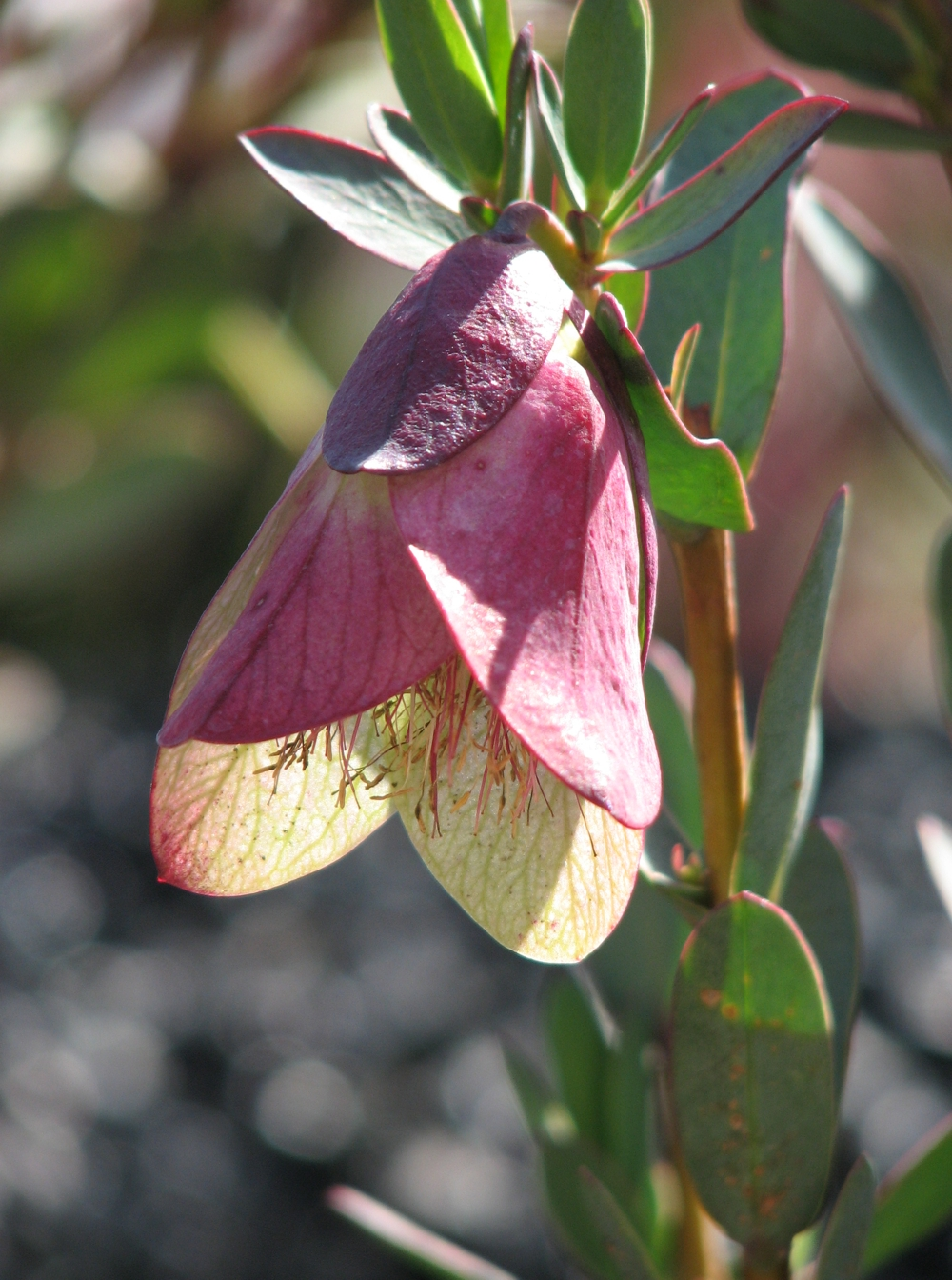
- Pimelea physodes in the Royal Botanic Gardens, Cranbourne

Scientific classification
- Kingdom: Plantae
- Clade: Tracheophytes
- Clade: Angiosperms
- Clade: Eudicots
- Clade: Rosids
- Order: Malvales
- Family: Thymelaeaceae
- Genus: Pimelea
- Species: P. physodes

Binomial name
- Pimelea physodes Hook.

Synonyms
- Banksia physodes (Hook.) Kuntze; Macrostegia erubescens Turcz.

= Pimelea physodes =

Qualup bell

Species of shrub

Pimelea physodes, commonly known as Qualup bell, is a species of shrub that is endemic to Western Australia. It has egg-shaped to narrow elliptical leaves and distinctive bell-like inflorescences with tiny greenish flowers surrounded by long elliptical bracts. The inflorescence resembles those of some of the only distantly-related darwinia "bells" and the bracts are a combination of red, purple, green and cream-coloured.

== Description ==
Pimelea physodes is a shrub that typically grows to a height of 0.2–1 m (7.9 in – 3 ft 3.4 in) and has a single stem at ground level. The leaves are arranged in opposite pairs, more or less sessile, egg-shaped to narrow elliptical, 12–32 mm (0.47–1.26 in) long and 5–11 mm (0.20–0.43 in) wide and the same shade of green on both sides. The flowers are arranged in a bell-like inflorescence similar to those of some species of the distantly related darwinias, especially Darwinia macrostegia, (Mondurup bell). The peduncle of the inflorescence is 3–14 mm (0.12–0.55 in) long. Each flower is green or creamy green with a floral cup 6–9 mm (0.24–0.35 in) long, the sepals very narrow triangular and about the same length. The flowers are mostly bisexual but a few are female. The stamens are 11–16 mm (0.43–0.63 in) long, as with other pimeleas there are no petals and the style is reddish and protrudes from the flower. Each group of flowers is surrounded by three or four pairs of green and cream-coloured bracts, usually also with varying amounts of red or purple. These bracts (strictly involucral bracts) are elliptical, 22–60 mm (0.87–2.36 in) long and 11–45 mm (0.43–1.77 in) wide and glabrous. Flowering occurs from July to October.

== Taxonomy and naming ==
Pimelea physodes was first formally described in 1852 by William Jackson Hooker in his book Icones Plantarum, from material collected by James Drummond. The specific epithet (physodes) is from an ancient Greek word meaning "a pair of bellows", referring to the paired bracts around the flowers.

== Distribution and habitat ==
Qualup bell grows on sandplains and hillsides in the near-coastal region between the Pallarup Nature Reserve, Fitzgerald River National Park, Jerramungup and Mount Desmond near Ravensthorpe.

== Ecology ==
Gregory John Keighery has recorded the tawny-crowned honeyeater (Gliciphila melanops) as a probable pollinator of the Qualup bell.

== Conservation status ==
This pimelea is classified as "not threatened" by the Western Australian Government Department of Parks and Wildlife.
