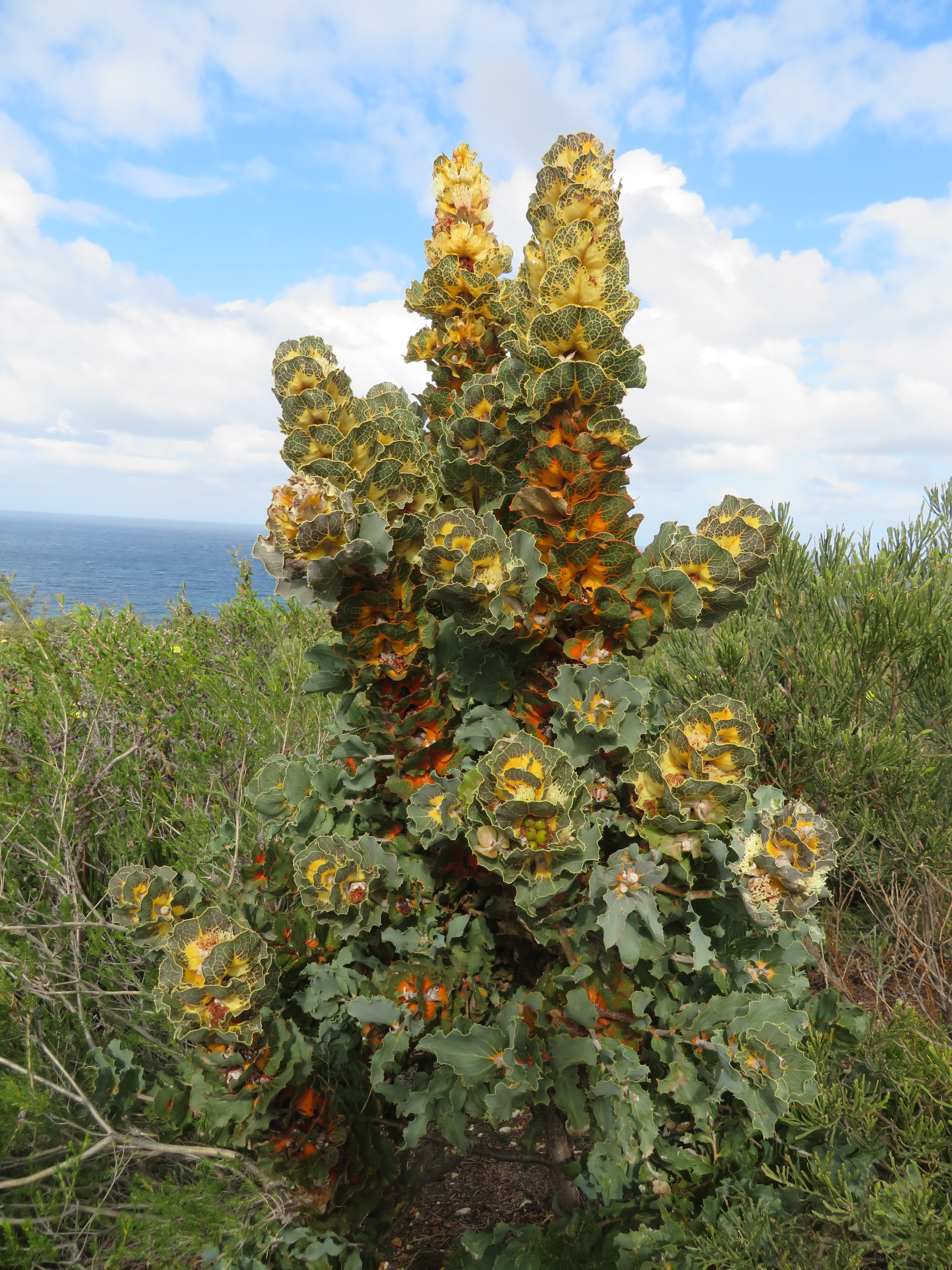
- In the Fitzgerald River National Park

Scientific classification
- Kingdom: Plantae
- Clade: Embryophytes
- Clade: Tracheophytes
- Clade: Angiosperms
- Clade: Eudicots
- Order: Proteales
- Family: Proteaceae
- Genus: Hakea
- Species: H. victoria

Binomial name
- Hakea victoria J.Drumm.

= Hakea victoria =

Species of shrub endemic to Western Australia

Hakea victoria, commonly known as royal hakea and lantern hakea, is a shrub endemic to Western Australia and noted for its ornamental foliage. The Noongar name for the plant is tallyongut.

== Description ==
Hakea victoria has an erect slender growth habit growing to 1–3 m (3 ft 3 in – 9 ft 10 in) high and 1 m (3 ft 3 in) wide with few branches and does not form a lignotuber. The leaves are arranged alternately, with distinct veins on the upper and under side, 4–11.5 cm (1.6–4.5 in) long and 4–13 mm (0.16–0.51 in) wide. The leaves are rough and leathery, the margin wavy with prickly teeth and ending with a sharp point. The lower leaves are green and narrow, the upper leaves are broad, concave, more or less circular, yellow at the base and shading to green at the apex. The inflorescence is a cluster of 26–42 small cream-white, red or pink flowers in leaf axils that are almost obscured by the leaf shape. The smooth pedicel is 6–11 mm (0.24–0.43 in) long, pistil 33–37 mm (1.3–1.5 in) long and the perianth cream coloured. Flowering occurs from June to October. The woody fruits are about 25 mm (0.98 in) long and between 15–20 mm (0.59–0.79 in) wide, and contain two winged seeds. The pods are serotinous, and will typically retain their seeds until triggered by environmental factors, such as a bushfire.

== Taxonomy and naming ==
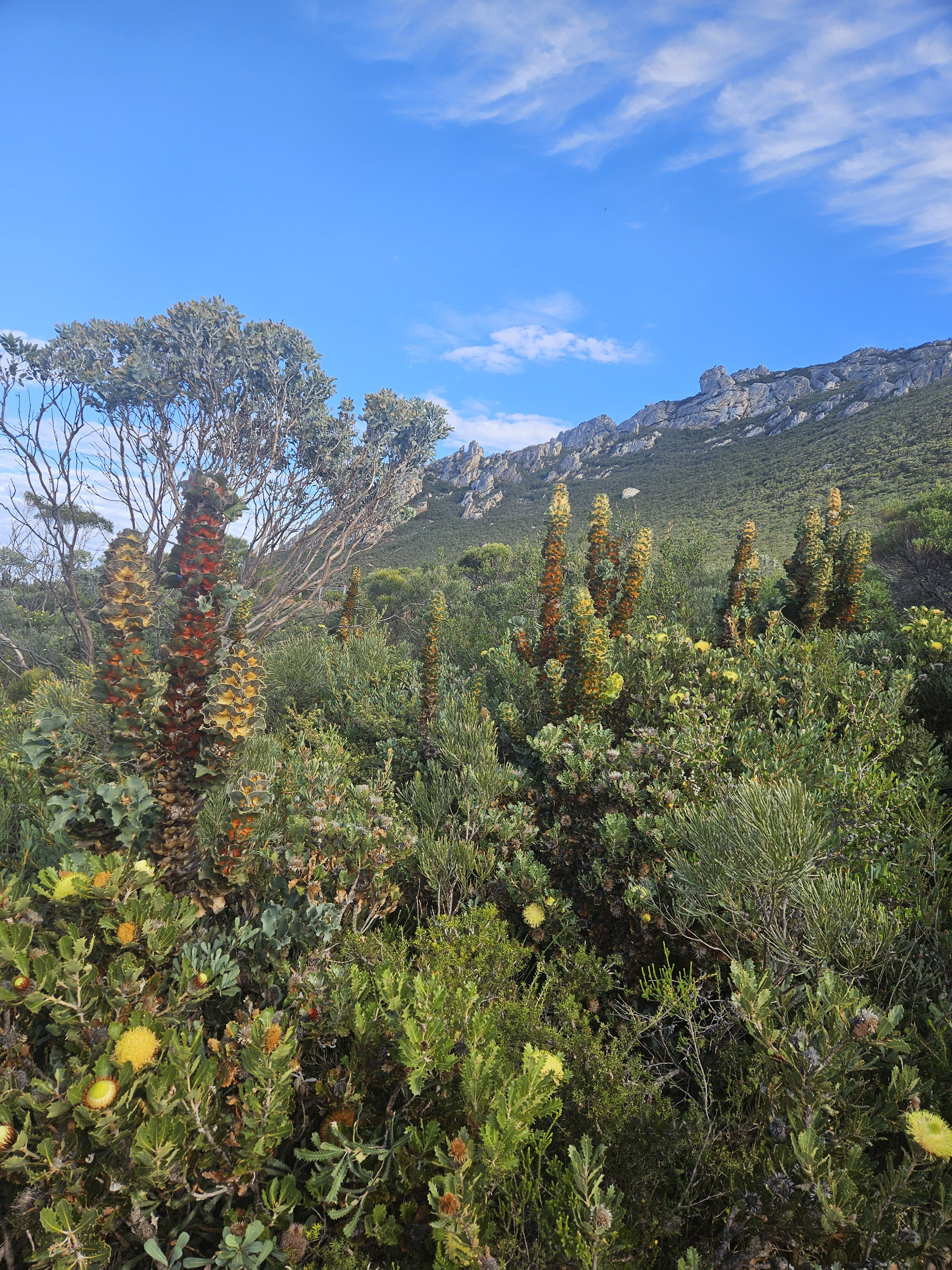
Habitat

The type specimen of Hakea victoria was collected near West Mount Barren (located in what is now Fitzgerald River National Park) by botanist James Drummond and was first described by him in 1847 in The Inquirer newspaper. The specific epithet is named in honour of Queen Victoria by the naturalist John Gilbert.

== Distribution and habitat ==
Royal hakea grows in quartzitic or lateritic sand mostly in rocky locations in the coastal region between Albany and Esperance, including the Fitzgerald River National Park.

== Use in horticulture ==
The species requires a well-drained, sunny situation and will tolerate moderate frost. Plants are not suited to humid conditions; even if they survive, foliage colour will be poor. Propagation is easy by seed, but quite difficult from cuttings.
