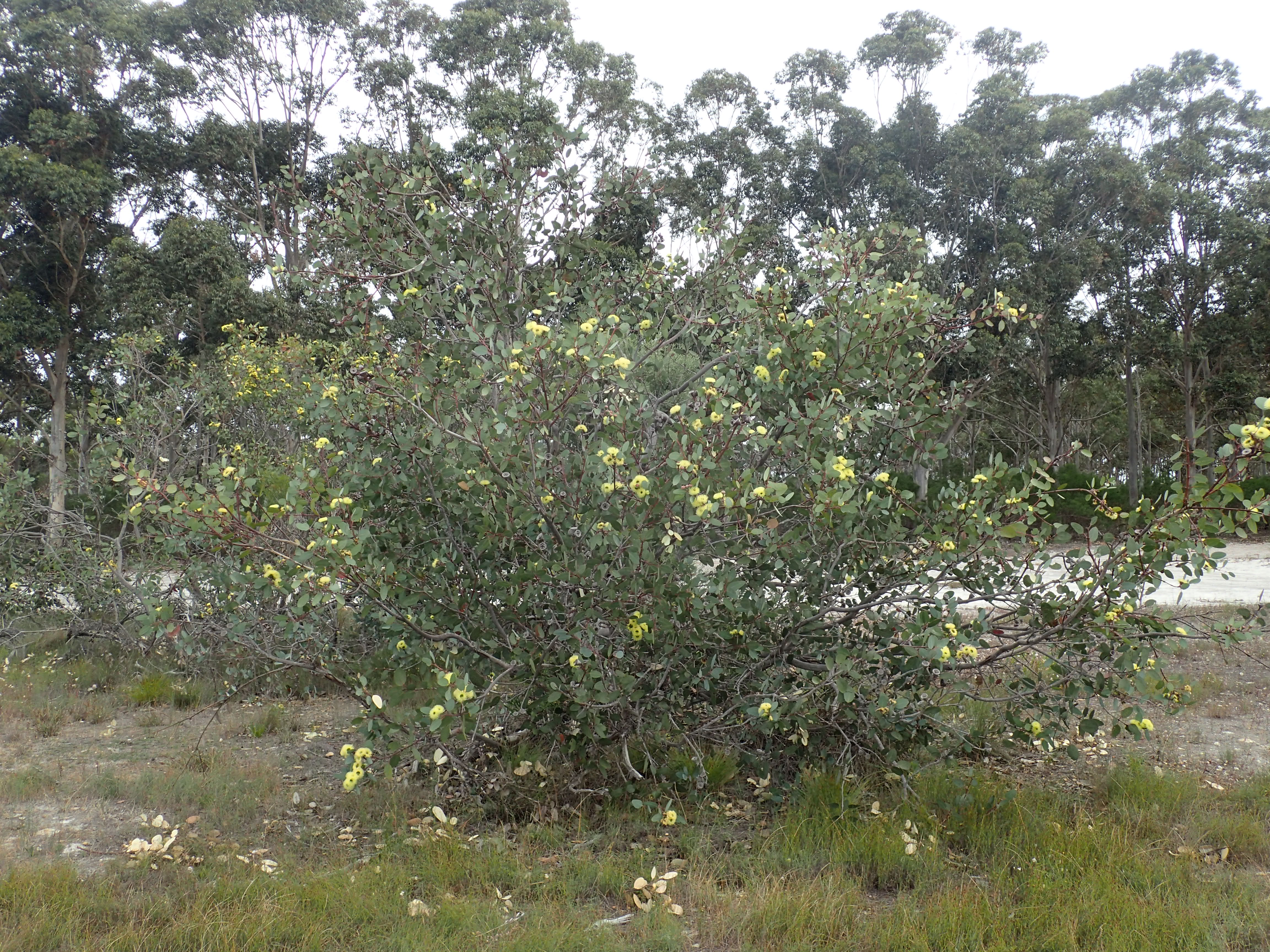
- In Helms Arboretum, near Esperance

Conservation status
- Near Threatened (IUCN 3.1)

Scientific classification
- Kingdom: Plantae
- Clade: Tracheophytes
- Clade: Angiosperms
- Clade: Eudicots
- Clade: Rosids
- Order: Myrtales
- Family: Myrtaceae
- Genus: Eucalyptus
- Species: E. preissiana

Binomial name
- Eucalyptus preissiana Schauer

= Eucalyptus preissiana =

Bell-fruited mallee

Species of eucalyptus

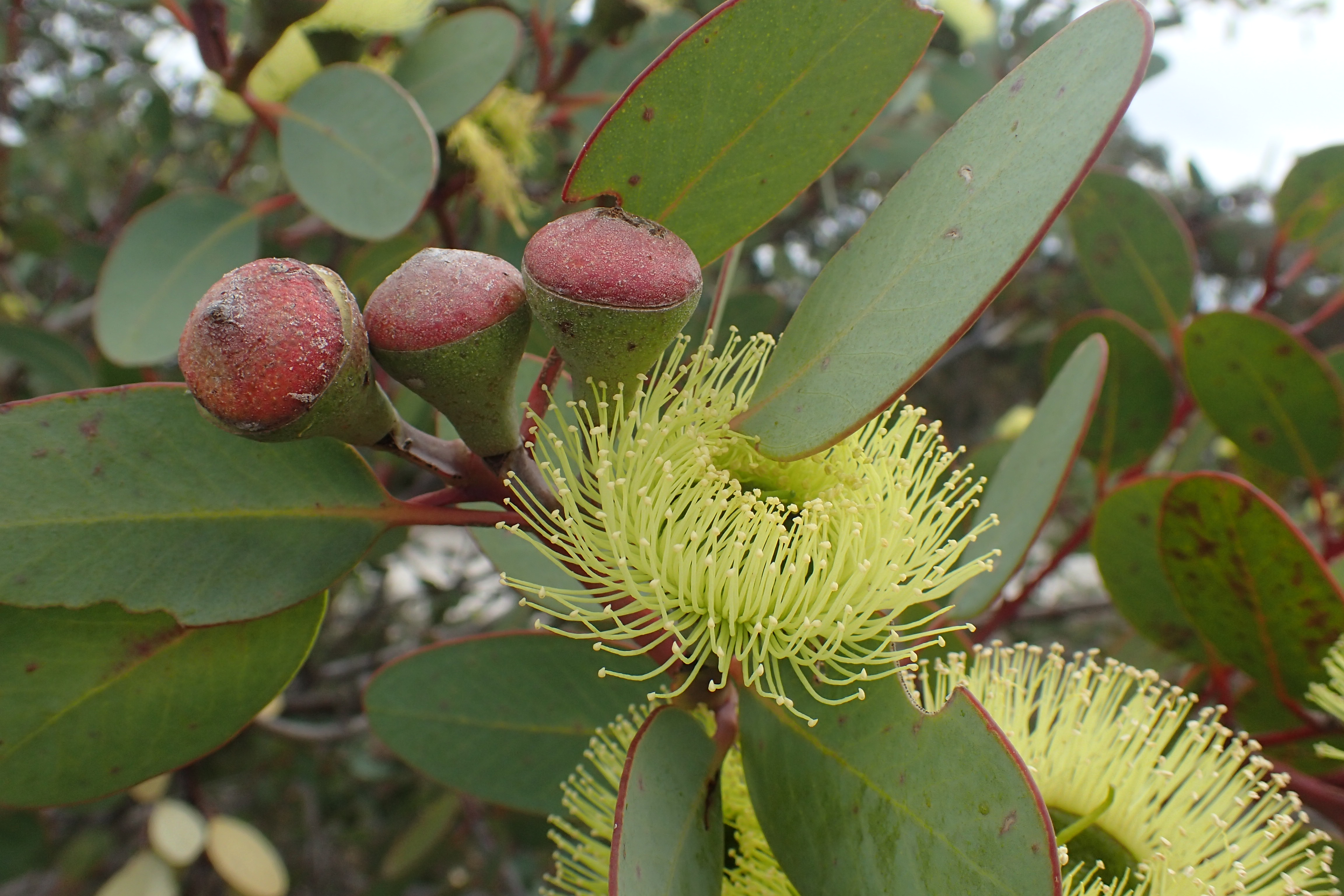
Leaves, flower buds and flowers

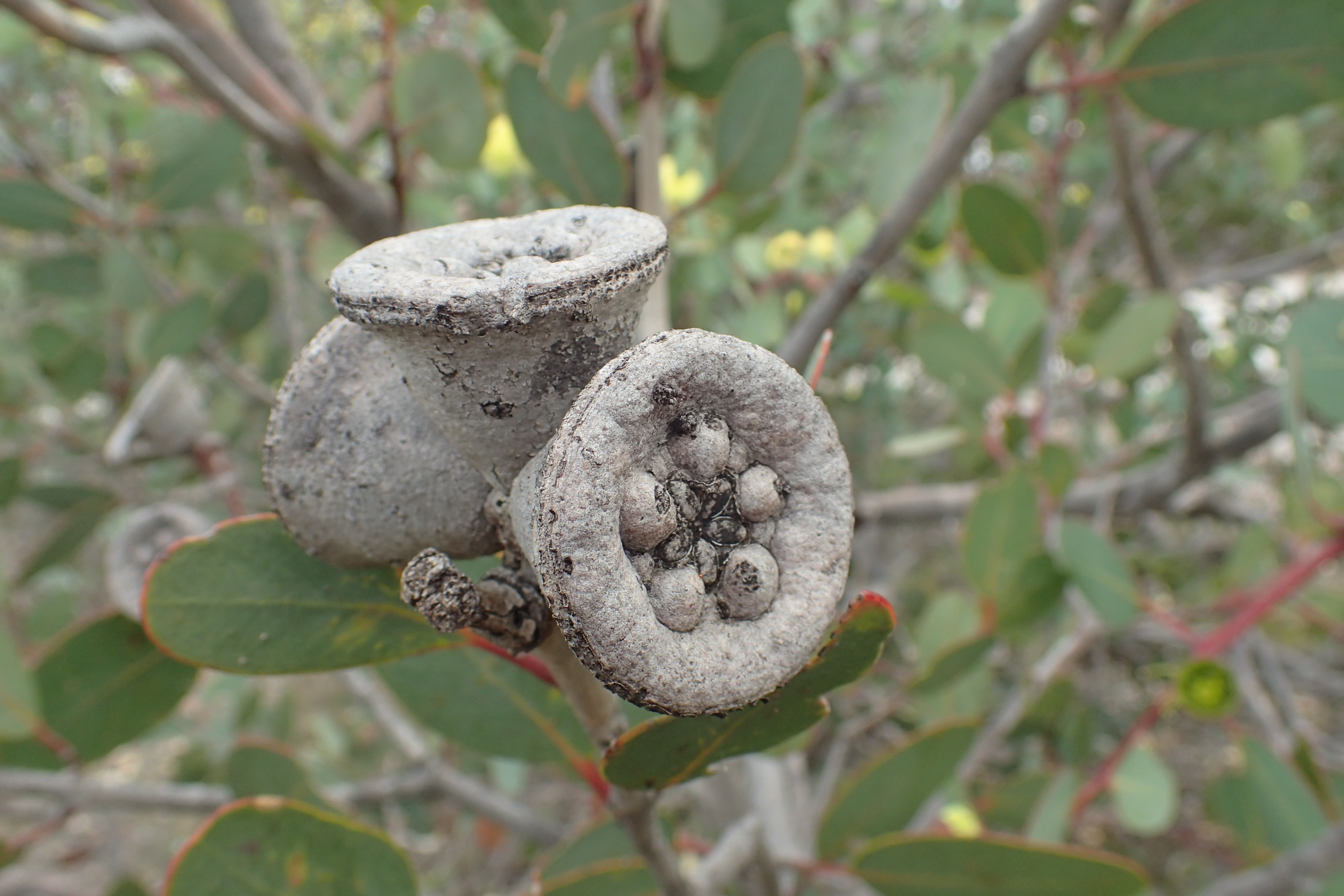
Fruit

Eucalyptus preissiana, commonly known as bell-fruited mallee, is a species of small tree or shrub that occurs in an area between Albany and Esperance in Western Australia. It has a spreading habit, smooth bark, elliptical to egg-shaped or oblong leaves, flower buds in groups of three, yellow flowers and cup-shaped, conical or bell-shaped fruit.

== Description ==
Eucalyptus preissiana is a mallee that typically grows to a height of 3–5 m (9.8–16.4 ft) with a sprawling habit, and forms a lignotuber. It has smooth, greyish and brown bark. Young plants and coppice regrowth have stems that are square in cross-section and elliptical to egg-shaped leaves that are the greyish green, 50–93 mm (2.0–3.7 in) long, 30–62 mm (1.2–2.4 in) wide and arranged in opposite pairs. Adult leaves are sometimes arranged alternately, the same shade of dull greyish green on both sides, elliptical to egg-shaped or oblong, 65–130 mm (2.6–5.1 in) long and 25–50 mm (0.98–1.97 in) wide on a petiole 10–40 mm (0.39–1.57 in) long. The flower buds are arranged in leaf axils on a flattened, unbranched peduncle 8–25 mm (0.31–0.98 in) long, the individual buds on pedicels 2–5 mm (0.079–0.197 in) long. Mature buds are oval, 15–26 mm (0.59–1.02 in) long and 13–18 mm (0.51–0.71 in) wide with a conical to rounded operculum. Flowering occurs from September to November and the flowers are yellow. The fruit is a woody, cup-shaped, conical or bell-shaped capsule 15–27 mm (0.59–1.06 in) long and 20–38 mm (0.79–1.50 in) wide with lobes between the valves.

== Taxonomy and naming ==
Eucalyptus preissiana was first formally described in 1844 by the Johannes Conrad Schauer and the description was published in Lehmann's book Plantae Preissianae. The specific epithet honours Ludwig Preiss who collected the type specimen near Cape Riche in 1840.

In 1995 Ian Brooker and Andrew Slee described two subspecies and the names have been accepted by the Australian Plant Census:

- Eucalyptus preissiana subsp. lobata Brooker & Slee differs from subspecies preissiana in having large lobes between the valves of the fruit;
- Eucalyptus preissiana Schauer subsp. preissiana has fruit that lack lobes or have small lobes below the rim of the fruit.

== Distribution ==
Bell-fruited mallee is found in coastal and sub-coastal areas among limestone and laterite and grows in gravelly sandy-clay soils. It occurs in coastal and near-coastal areas from the Stirling Range to the Fitzgerald River National Park and almost to Esperance to the east. Subspecies lobata only occurs in coastal areas in a few places between Esperance and Hopetoun.

== Conservation status ==
Subspecies preissiana is classified as "not threatened" by the Western Australian Government Department of Parks and Wildlife, but subspecies lobata is classified as "Priority Four" by the Government of Western Australia Department of Parks and Wildlife, meaning that is rare or near threatened. The IUCN Red List assesses the species as Near Threatened.

== Use in horticulture ==
Bell-fruited mallee can be cultivated in temperate areas of Australia but performs poorly in tropical environments. It is propagated from seeds and germinates easily. It prefers a position in full sun and in well-drained soils.

== See also ==
- List of Eucalyptus species
