= Albany Club (Western Australia) =

Gentlemen's club in Albany, Western Australia

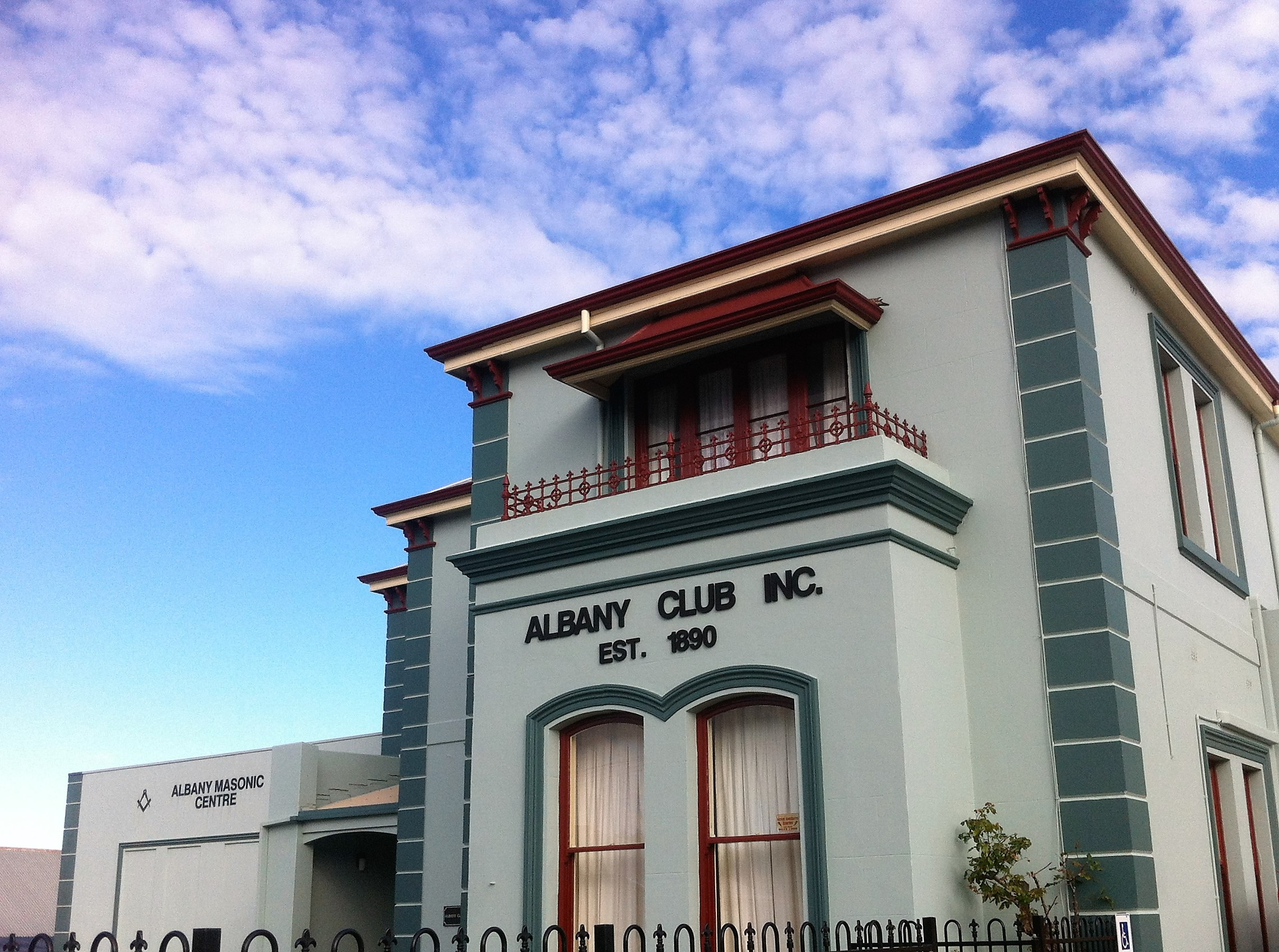
- Interactive map of the Albany Club area
- Former names: Aberdeen House

General information
- Location: 23 Aberdeen Street, Albany
- Coordinates: 35.0249°S 117.8847°E

Western Australia Heritage Register
- Type: State Registered Place
- Designated: 9 May 2006
- Reference no.: 3

References
- Heritage Council of Western Australia

The Albany Club also known as the Aberdeen House is a heritage listed building located on Aberdeen Street in Albany in the Great Southern region of Western Australia.

In Western Australia, only the Weld Club in Perth is older than the Albany gentlemen's club, which was established in 1894. No private club outside the metropolitan area has occupied the same building for so long.

John Moir, who served as the mayor of Albany for four terms, built a new residence on Aberdeen Street in 1886; his wife died shortly before the residence was completed. Moir, who was also a founding member of the Albany Club, let it be used as a club facility from 1895 until 1939 when the club acquired the building. The Albany Club building later became heritage listed.

The building has two storeys and is constructed of stuccoed brick and with a corrugated iron roof, designed in the Victorian Style with Italianate elements.

In 2005 the building received interim heritage listing.

Foundation members of the club include: Albert Young Hassell, John Moir, S. J. Haynes and W. H. Angove.

== See also ==
- List of places on the State Register of Heritage Places in the City of Albany
