= John Hassell (settler) =

Australian ship captain and settler (1788–1883)

John Hassell (1788 – 15 August 1883) was an Australian pastoralist.

Hassell was born in 1788 to Francis Carolus Tennant Hassell, shipbroker and merchant, and his wife Sarah, née Govey, in London, England. As a young man he followed family tradition and joined the navy. He later transferred to the mercantile marine and then the Chilean navy, and was taken prisoner by the Peruvian navy for about a year.

He arrived in Tasmania in 1822 and commanded ship along the trade routes between Sydney, Hobart and Launceston, eventually being granted 500 acres (200 ha) in the Tamar Valley where he ran cattle.

Returning to England in 1836 to 1837, and marrying Ellen Boucher, he bought a 266-short-ton (241 t) brig named Dawson, which he stocked with goods and sailed to King George Sound. The business partner in the 'Adventure Syndicate' was his brother in law, Frederick Boucher, who remained in England. At the settlement of Albany he sold much of his merchandise then acquired a 20,000-acre (8,094 ha) property near Kendenup. He then set sail for Tasmania, where he sold the remainder of his cargo, Dawson and his Tasmanian holdings. He then made his way to Sydney and bought livestock and farming equipment then made his way back to Albany arriving in 1840. After droving his 850 sheep to Kendenup he acquired more grazing land and by 1850 he owned 20,000 acres (8,094 ha) freehold and 38,000 acres (15,378 ha) leasehold mostly in Kendenup and Jerramungup.

He later settled in Albany and ran an importing business and oversaw his properties. By 1870 Kendenup was stocked with nearly 30,000 sheep. He died on 15 August 1883, survived by his wife and five children. Both his eldest son, John Hassell, and second-eldest, Albert Young Hassell, were prominent pastoralists and members of parliament.
