= Ethel Hassell =

Colonist, author, ethnographer of Southwest Australia

Ethel Hassell (nee Clifton, 1857-1933) was a colonial author who lived near Albany, Western Australia. She wrote several texts on the colony and Nyungar peoples of Southwest Australia, especially those she knew at the region around Broome Hill, Albany, and toward Doubtful Islands Bay.

== Biography ==
Born in 1857 to Sophia Harriet (née Adcock) and William Carmalt Clifton (1820–1885) in Middlesex, England, her father's occupation as an agent of P&O had the family located to Mauritius in 1859 then the Western Australian port of Albany in 1861. Ethel Clifton and her elder sisters were placed among an elite of P&O officials in Albany society, and commercial rivals to the family of Albert Young Hassell, whom she eventually married on 22 June 1878 at a church in Perth. The couple had three daughters and four sons, she died 30 October 1933.

Hassell lived at a station at Jerramungup, remote from large towns and a great distance south of the state's capital Perth. She closely associated with the people of the area for an extended period in the late nineteenth century, recording their beliefs and creation stories on flora, fauna, and the landscape in a diary that was published as My Dusky Friends in 1975. Her reverence for the subject matter is regarded as unusual for the period, as is her thoroughness and care in inclusion of material that included interviews with women of all ages.

She corresponded with Daniel Sutherland Davidson on a manuscript (c. 1930) submitted to Macmillan Publishers toward the end of her life, research that he edited for publication as 'Notes on the ethnology of the Wheelman Tribe of south-western Australia' (1936). This followed her own work Myths and folktales of the Wheelman tribe of South-Western Australia (1934) on the Wiilman people. Her work as an amateur ethnographer is rarely cited and largely unknown, although it contains an extensive and intimate record of the people and environment of Jarramungup, a remote part of a region lacking scientific research in the nineteenth century. In contrast to other women writing within the colonial settlements—Louisa Atkinson, Caroline Dexter, Eliza Dunlop—Hassell does not write of frontier history and conflict arising during colonisation, adopting a uncritical position that the historical events she studied and heard were inevitabilities of 'progress'; events such as the disposition of land entitlement in which the Hassell family were themselves involved. A later researcher (Izett, Ms. 2014) suggests the motive may have been a form of 'tactical advocacy' at a time when the traditional culture of Australia's inhabitants was poorly known if not misrepresented as propaganda. Ethel wrote of her friends,

‘they looked so happy and contented that I wondered if, after all, theirs was not the happiest existence. No care beyond a sufficiency of food and water which they could generally get. — My Dusky Friends: Aboriginal Life, Customs and Legends and Glimpses of Station Life at Jerramungup in the 1880s, p. 18.

The author's observations, aside from their ethnological value, included botanical notes and local history, and comparisons of the changing landscape to early sketches of King George Sound; examples of these were published in her locally printed work Early Memories of Albany (c. 1910).
