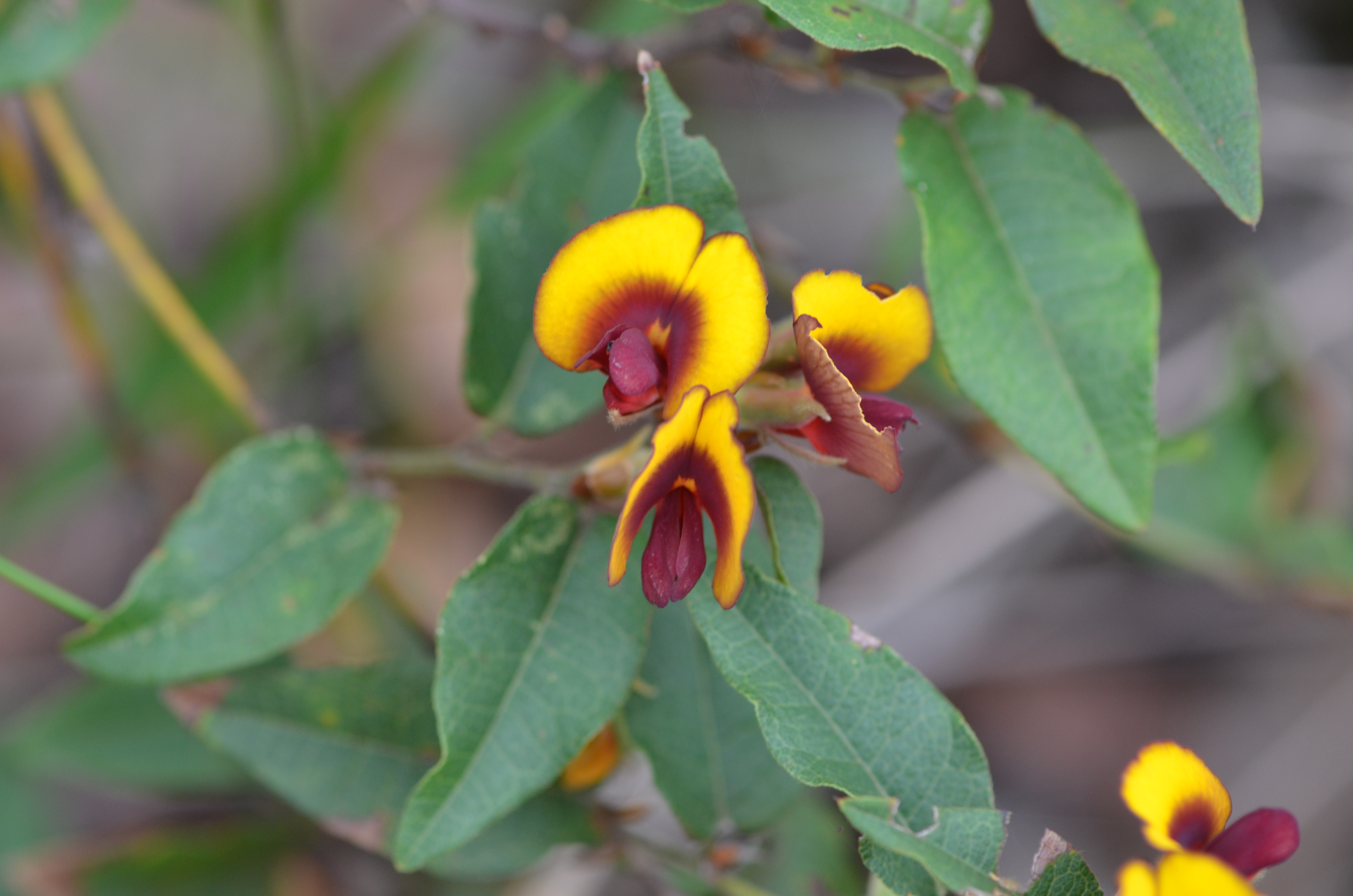

Scientific classification
- Kingdom: Plantae
- Clade: Tracheophytes
- Clade: Angiosperms
- Clade: Eudicots
- Clade: Rosids
- Order: Fabales
- Family: Fabaceae
- Subfamily: Faboideae
- Genus: Bossiaea
- Species: B. ornata

Binomial name
- Bossiaea ornata (Lindl.) Benth.
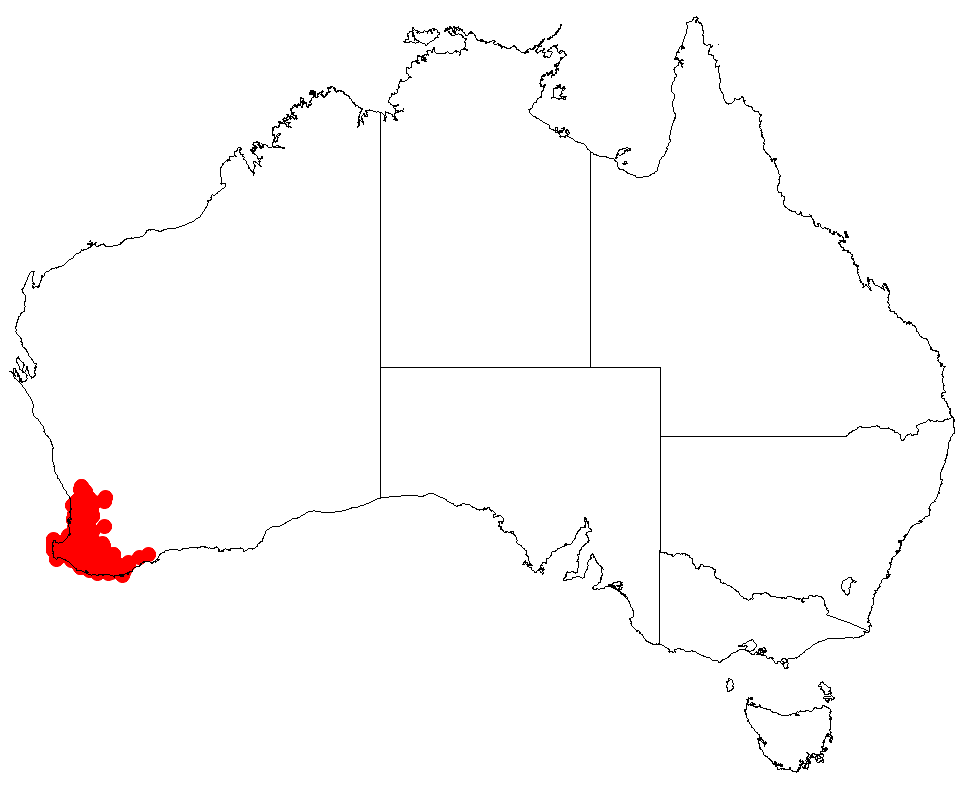
- Range map generated from data at Australasian Virtual Herbarium

= Bossiaea ornata =

Broad leaved brown pea

Species of legume

Bossiaea ornata, commonly known as broad leaved brown pea, is a species of flowering plant in the family Fabaceae and is endemic to the south-west of Western Australia. It is a shrub with variably-shaped leaves, typically egg-shaped or oblong, and yellow or orange-yellow and reddish-brown flowers.

== Description ==
Bossiaea ornata is a shrub that typically grows up to a height of up to 1.2 m (3 ft 11 in), sometimes to 2 m (6 ft 7 in) and has many stems. The leaves are variably-shaped but typically egg-shaped to oblong, 16–60 mm (0.63–2.36 in) long and 5–30 mm (0.20–1.18 in) wide on a petiole 1.5–4 mm (0.059–0.157 in) long with stipules 2–6 mm (0.079–0.236 in) long at the base. The flowers are arranged singly or in pairs or threes, each flower on a hairy pedicel 4–11 mm (0.16–0.43 in) long with up to thirteen overlapping bracts at the base. The five sepals are joined at the base forming a tube 2–6 mm (0.079–0.236 in) long with lobes 4.5–9 mm (0.18–0.35 in) long, the two upper lobes slightly broader than the lower ones. The standard petal is yellow or orange-yellow with a reddish brown margin and base and 12.5–19 mm (0.49–0.75 in) long, the wings 11.3–14.1 mm (0.44–0.56 in) long, and the keel red or reddish brown and 10.2–13.2 mm (0.40–0.52 in) long. Flowering occurs from July to November.

== Taxonomy and naming ==
Broad leaved brown pea was first formally described in 1835 by John Lindley who gave it the name Lalage ornata in Edwards's Botanical Register from specimens grown in the "Mr Knight's Nursery" from seed collected by William Baxter. In 1864, George Bentham changed the name to Bossiaea ornata in Flora Australiensis. The specific epithet (ornata) means "handsome" or "showy".

== Distribution and habitat ==
This bossiaea is found between the Avon Valley National Park and south to Augusta, Western Australia, then east to Albany in the Esperance Plains, Jarrah Forest, Swan Coastal Plain and Warren biogeographic regions, growing in the understorey of forest and woodland.

== Conservation status ==
Bossiaea ornata is classified as "not threatened" by the Western Australian Government Department of Parks and Wildlife.
