= West River, Western Australia =

Locality in the Shire of Ravensthorpe, Western Australia

West River
- Interactive map of West River
- Coordinates: 33.61782°S 119.58085°E
- Country: Australia
- State: Western Australia
- LGA: Shire of Ravensthorpe
- Location: 402 km (250 mi) SE of Perth; 68 km (42 mi) S of Lake King; 40 km (25 mi) W of Ravensthorpe

Government
  - State electorate: Roe
  - Federal division: O'Connor

Area
  - Total: 1,132.8 km^{2} (437.4 sq mi)

Population
  - Total: 71 (SAL 2021)
- Postcode: 6346
Localities around West River
Magenta	Dunn Rock	Mount Madden
Fitzgerald	West River	Ravensthorpe
West Fitzgerald	Fitzgerald River NP	Ravensthorpe

West River is a rural locality of the Shire of Ravensthorpe in the Goldfields-Esperance region of Western Australia. The South Coast Highway passes through the locality from west to east. West River borders the Fitzgerald River National Park to the south and the townsite of Fitzgerald to the west. The West River and the Hamersley River originate in the locality. The Long Creek Nature Reserve as well as an unnamed nature reserve are located in the north of West River.

== History ==
West River is located on the traditional land of the Wudjari people of the Noongar nation.

The Old Ongerup Road in West River is listed on the shire's heritage register, dating back to the late 1860s.

In late November/early December 2025, a bushfire burnt over 4,000 hectares of bush and farmland in West River, with at least one death reported.

== Nature reserves ==
The following nature reserves are located within West River. Both are located within the Esperance Plains bioregion, with the unnamed nature reserve also stretching into the Mallee bioregion:

- Long Creek Nature Reserve was gazetted on 23 March 1973 and has a size of 3.22 square kilometres (1.24 mi^{2}).
- Unnamed WA31424 Nature Reserve was gazetted on 7 July 1972 and has a size of 29.36 square kilometres (11.34 mi^{2}).
