= Shire of Jerramungup =

Local government area in the Great Southern region of Western Australia

Coordinates: 33°56′31″S 118°54′58″E

- Local government area
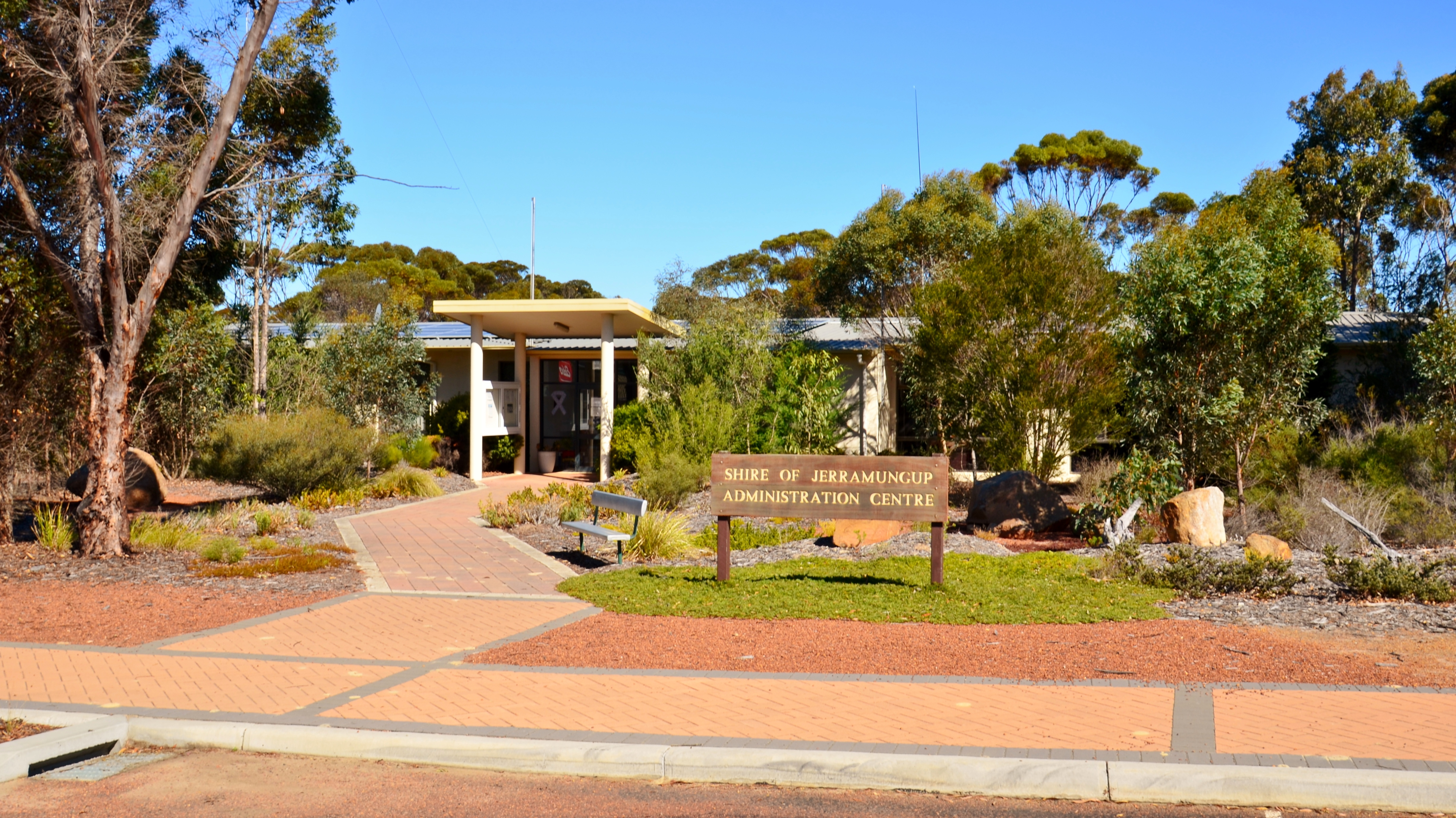
- Administration Centre

- Interactive map of Shire of Jerramungup
- Country: Australia
- State: Western Australia
- Region: Great Southern
- Established: 1982
- Council seat: Jerramungup

Government
  - Shire President: Nathan Brown
  - State electorate: Roe
  - Federal division: O'Connor

Area
  - Total: 6,507.1 km^{2} (2,512.4 sq mi)

Population
  - Total: 1,160 (LGA 2021)
  - Density: 0.18/km^{2} (0.47/sq mi)
- Website: Shire of Jerramungup
LGAs around Shire of Jerramungup
Kent	Kent	Ravensthorpe
Gnowangerup	Shire of Jerramungup	Ravensthorpe
Albany	Southern Ocean	Southern Ocean

The Shire of Jerramungup is a local government area in the Great Southern region of Western Australia, about 180 kilometres (112 mi) northeast of Albany and about 440 kilometres (273 mi) southeast of the state capital, Perth. The Shire covers an area of 6,507 square kilometres (2,512 sq mi) with Bremer Bay its largest town. The seat of government is the town of Jerramungup.

The Fitzgerald River National Park, within the Shire, covers an area of 2,972 square kilometres (1,147 sq mi). The park is one of the most botanically significant national parks in Australia, containing 20% of Western Australia's described plant species - more than 1,800 in total.

== History ==
The Shire of Jerramungup was established on 1 July 1982. It previously comprised the eastern half of the Shire of Gnowangerup.

== Indigenous people ==
The majority of the Shire of Jerramungup is located on the traditional land of the Koreng people of the Noongar nation. During the early days of European settlement, the Wudjari people, also of the Noongar nation, moved into the eastern parts of what is now the Shire of Jerramungup.

== Wards ==
As of the 2003 elections, the shire is not divided into wards, and its 7 councillors sit at large.

== Towns and localities ==
The towns and localities of the Shire of Jerramungup with population and size figures based on the most recent Australian census:

Locality	Population	Area	Map
Boxwood Hill	91 (SAL 2021)	630.7 km^{2} (243.5 sq mi)	
Bremer Bay	424 (SAL 2021)	617.6 km^{2} (238.5 sq mi)	
Fitzgerald River National Park * ‡	4 (SAL 2021)	2,420 km^{2} (930 sq mi)	
Gairdner	105 (SAL 2021)	975.3 km^{2} (376.6 sq mi)	
Jacup	71 (SAL 2021)	696.9 km^{2} (269.1 sq mi)	
Jerramungup	353 (SAL 2021)	1,072.2 km^{2} (414.0 sq mi)	
Needilup	99 (SAL 2021)	845.2 km^{2} (326.3 sq mi)	
West Fitzgerald	20 (SAL 2021)	657.6 km^{2} (253.9 sq mi)	

- ( * indicates suburb partially located within City)
- ( ‡ indicates boundaries of national park and locality are not identical)

== Heritage-listed places ==
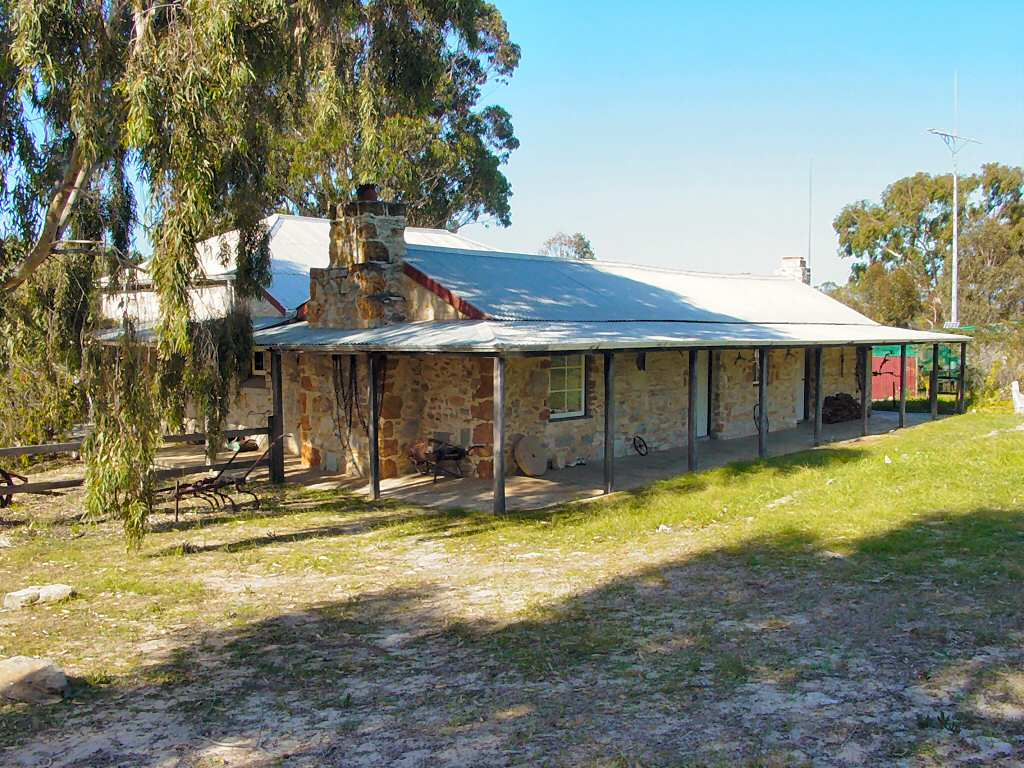
The state heritage listed Quaalup Homestead in Fitzgerald River National Park

As of 2023, 17 places are heritage-listed in the Shire of Jerramungup, of which three are on the State Register of Heritage Places.
