= Albert Young Hassell =

Australian pastoralist and politician

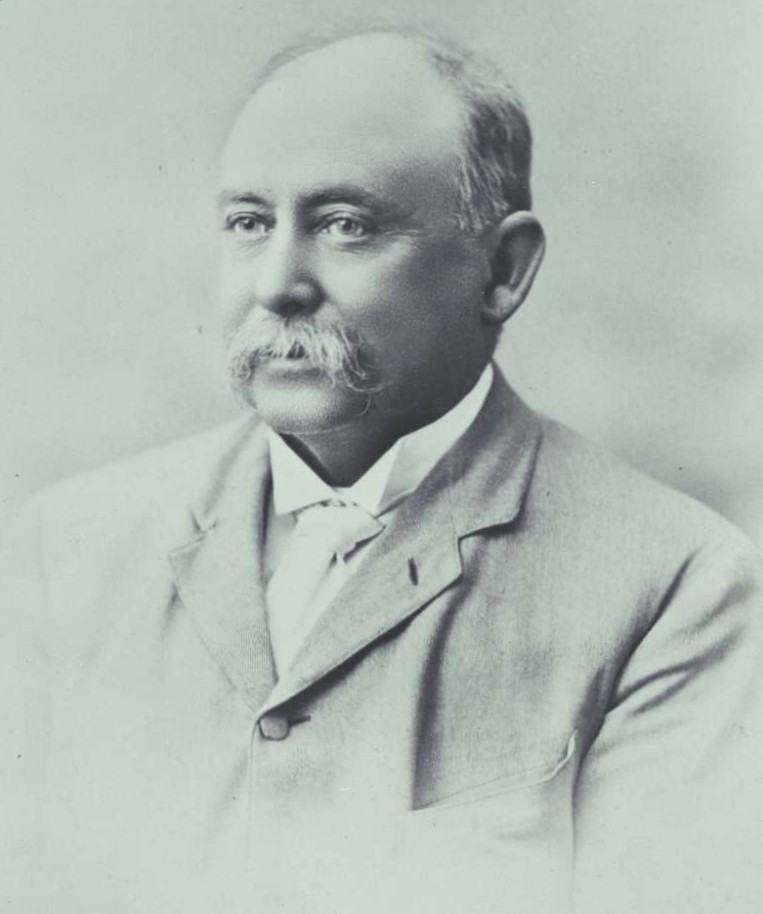
Albert Young Hassell

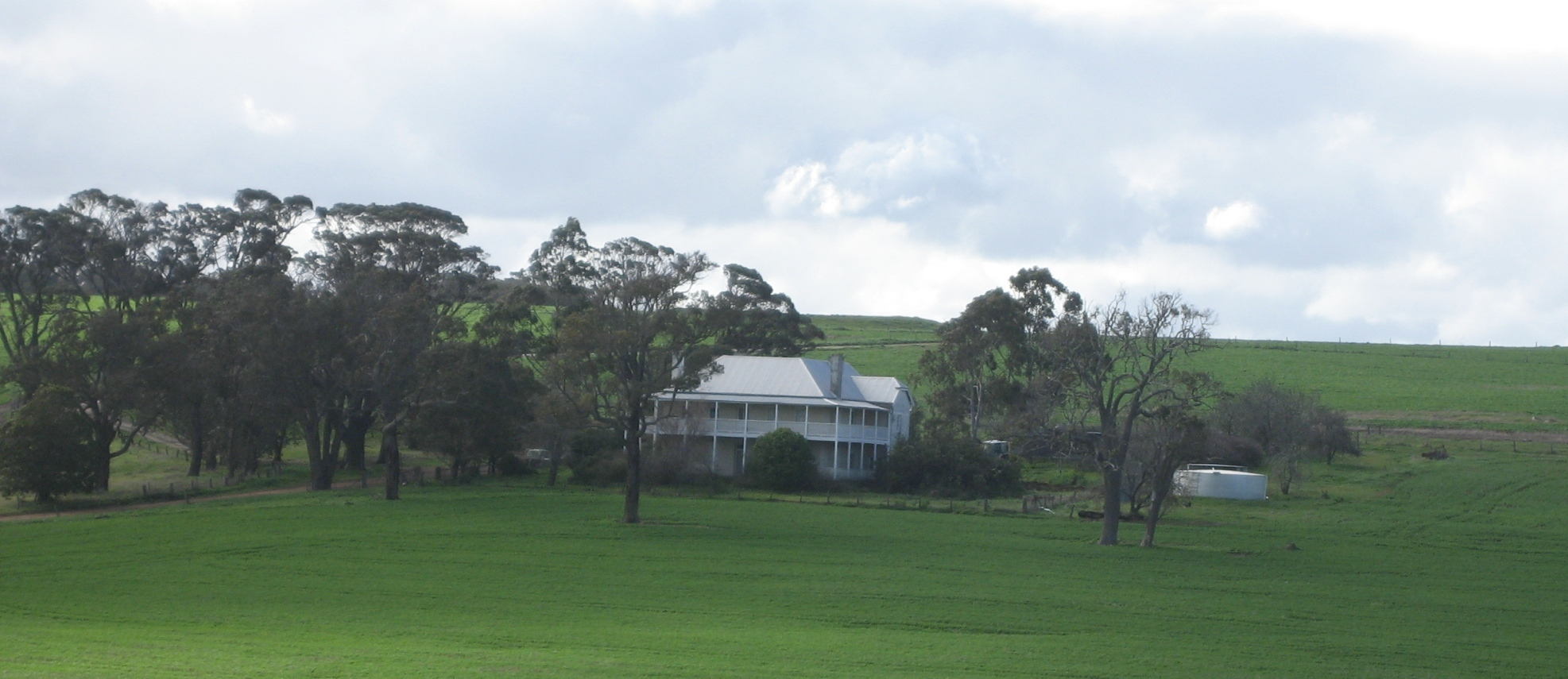
Hassell family homestead

Albert Young Hassell (15 November 1841 – 20 September 1918) was a prominent Australian pastoralist and politician.

Born in Albany, on 15 November 1841, Albert was the second son of pastoralist John Hassell who had pioneered the area around Kendenup in the Great Southern region of Western Australia in 1840. The young Albert was educated at a private school in Albany leaving at age 11 to work on the family farm.

Working on the property Albert Hassell eventually became manager of another of his father's properties near Jerramungup from 1861 to 1863. He became the first European to overland to Esperance during the time. From 1864 to 1878 Albert and his brother, John Frederick Hassell, ran the family businesses.

Hassell ran for parliament and won a by-election representing the seat of Albany in the colony's first part-elective Legislative Council from 1871 to 1874; after the term expired he resigned from the post. Under responsible government he later represented Plantagenet in the Legislative Assembly from 1890 to 1904. During his time he was also elected as the Western Australian representative at the Australasian Constitutional Convention from 1897 to 1898. After an electoral redistribution in 1904 Hassell stood for the seat of Albany and lost the seat; he then resigned from politics.

Hassell married Ethel Clifton in June 1878 and had four sons and three daughters.

Well known in the racing industry, Hassell bred, owned and successfully raced several horses. He was a foundation member of the Albany Club, a member of the Weld Club, a founder of the Plantagenet Lodge of Freemasons, a long serving member of the Albany Roads Board, a Justice of the Peace and a long time representative for P&O in Albany. As pastoralists the family introduced Saxon sheep onto their properties. Hassell improved the flocks and was awarded a grand prix in 1889 at the Paris Universal Exposition for twenty-five fleeces and later won more gold medals for his wool displays in exhibitions in France and Western Australia.

Hassell died in 1918 in Melbourne; his body was buried at Memorial Park Cemetery in Albany.

In 1887, the Victorian government botanist, Ferdinand von Mueller named Chorilaena Hassellii (now Muiriantha hassellii) in honour of Hassell, who had collected specimens of the plant from the western end of the Stirling Range.
