= Jerramungup, Western Australia =

Jerramungup
- Town
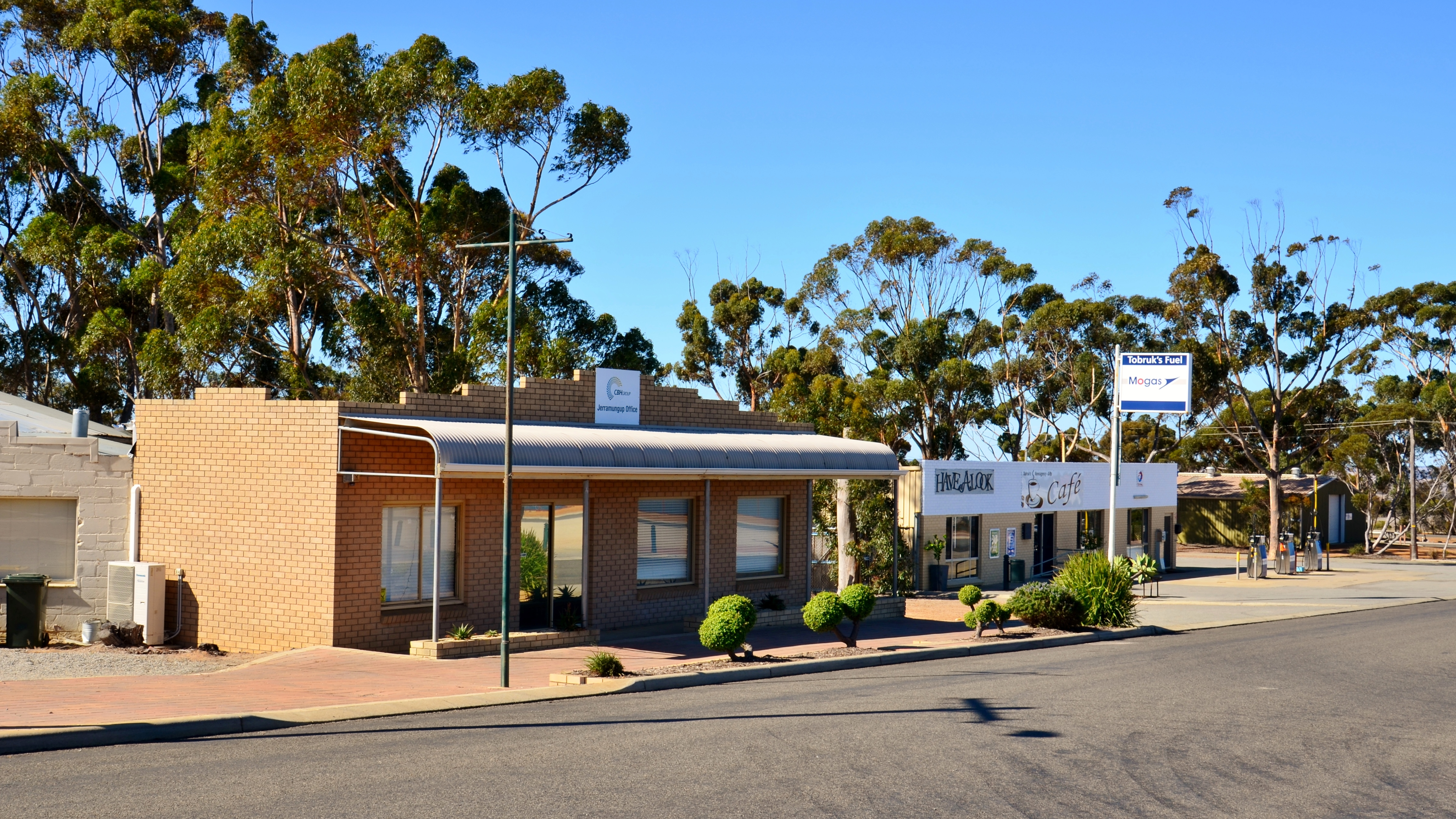
- Tobruk Road, Jerramungup, 2018

- Interactive map of Jerramungup
- Coordinates: 33.942°S 118.919°E
- Country: Australia
- State: Western Australia
- LGA: Shire of Jerramungup
- Location: 454 km (282 mi) SE of Perth; 84 km (52 mi) E of Gnowangerup; 66 km (41 mi) NW of Bremer Bay
- Established: 1953

Government
  - State electorate: Roe
  - Federal division: O'Connor

Area
  - Total: 1,072.2 km^{2} (414.0 sq mi)
- Elevation: 322 m (1,056 ft)

Population
  - Total: 265 (UCL 2021)
- Postcode: 6337
Localities around Jerramungup
Pingrup	Pingrup	Jacup
Needilup	Jerramungup	Fitzgerald River NP
Needilup	Gairdner	Fitzgerald River NP

Jerramungup is a town and locality in the Shire of Jerramungup, Great Southern region of Western Australia. Jerramungup is 454 kilometres (282 mi) southeast of Perth and 6 kilometres (4 mi) west of the Gairdner River.

The area was settled by Europeans prior to 1848, with the first homestead being built by John Hassell in 1848. The property was known as Jarramongup Station and was inherited by his son, Albert Young Hassell, who took up residence there with his wife Ethel after his father's death in 1885. The station was put up for sale by Edney Hassell and remained on the market for some time until it was acquired by the state government in 1950.

The town of Jerramongup was established in 1953 to support a war service land settlement project that was initiated in 1949. The townsite was gazetted as Jerramungup on 12 August 1957, although the name Jerramongup remained in use until the 1960s. The local school was renamed Jerramungup in 1968.

The town hall and the school were both built in 1958 along with two houses. Construction of the CBH Group wheat bin was completed in 1961. The first powerhouse was completed in 1963.

Jerramungup (Yarra-mo-up) is an Aboriginal word said to mean 'place of the tall yate trees'. The yate tree (Eucalyptus cornuta) is an evergreen tree that grows to a height of 20 metres (66 ft) with a diameter of 1 metre (3 ft 3 in). It has orange bud caps and greenish yellow flowers, and is common in the southwest of Western Australia. The name was first recorded by Surveyor General John Septimus Roe in 1848, when carrying out exploration of the area, noting that Aboriginal people referred to the area and river as Jeer-A-Mung-Up. Roe later named the river, at its mouth in Gordon Inlet, the Gairdner River.

The town hall was opened in April 1958 and is known colloquially as the Root Pickers Hall as it was paid for by volunteers picking mallee roots.

200 tonnes (440,000 lb) of Laguna Verde or Laguna Green monzonite from Jerramungup were used to make the Australian War Memorial in London, which was opened in Hyde Park in 2003. The quarry is situated 21 kilometres (13 mi) south of the town, at Wirrup Hill.
