= Fitzgerald River National Park =

National park in Western Australia

- IUCN category II (national park)
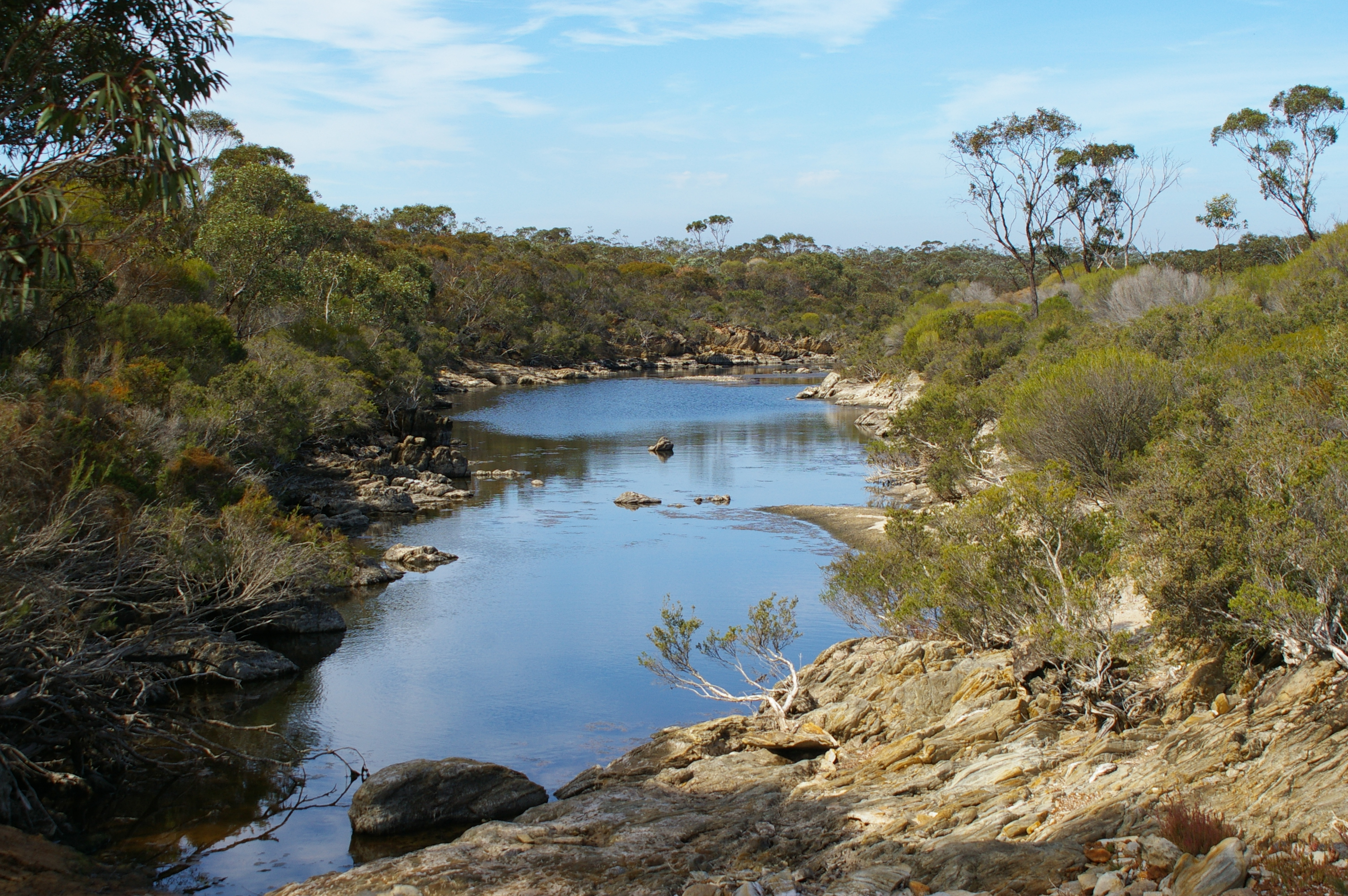
- Gairdner River in the National Park

- Location within Western Australia
- Location: Western Australia
- Coordinates: 33°56′51″S 119°36′55″E
- Area: 2,972.11 km^{2} (1,147.54 sq mi)
- Established: 1973
- Visitors: 40000 (in 2008)
- Governing body: Department of Biodiversity, Conservation, and Attractions
- Website: exploreparks.dbca.wa.gov.au/park/fitzgerald-river-national-park

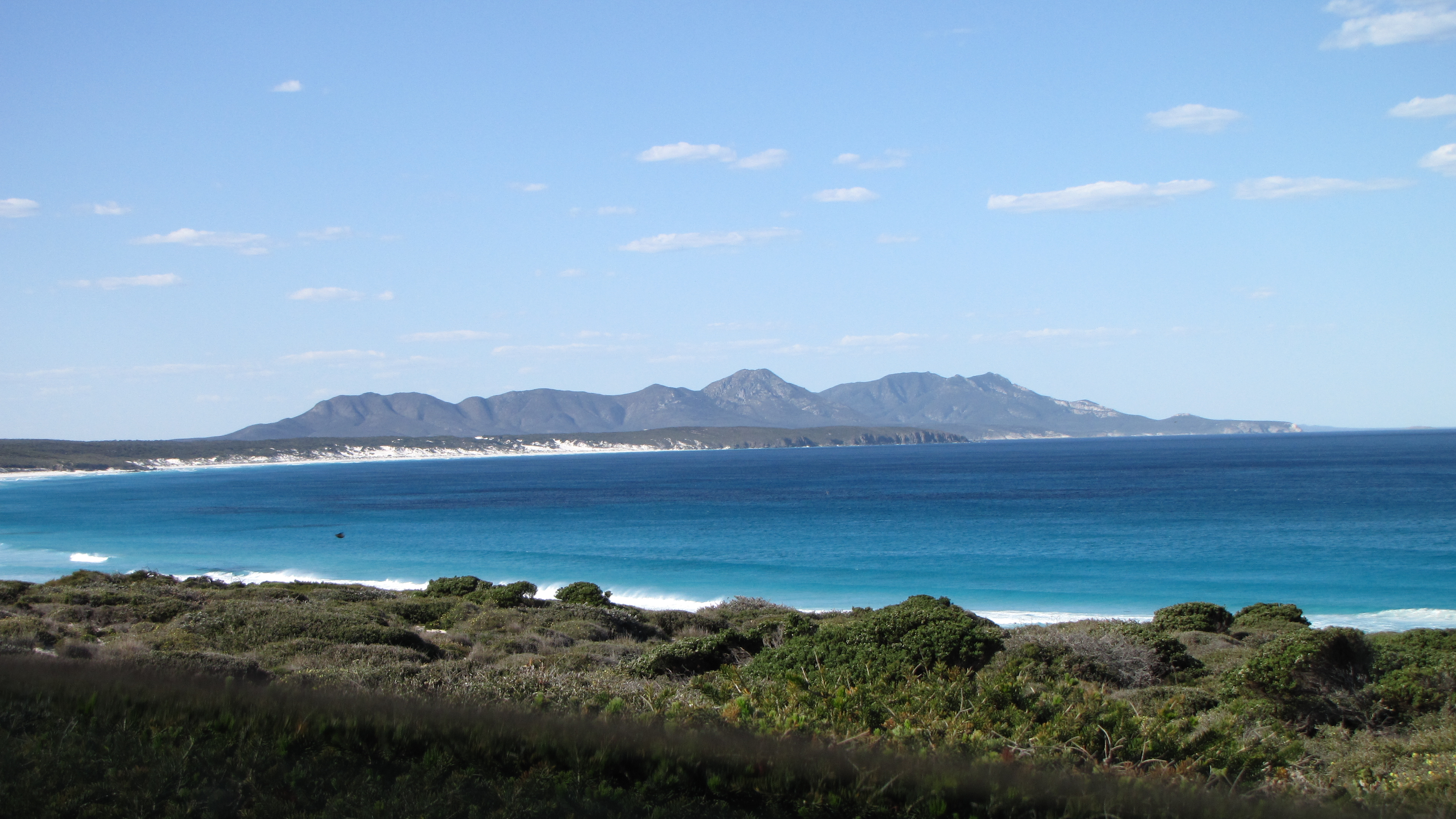
Fitzgerald River National Park from Point Ann

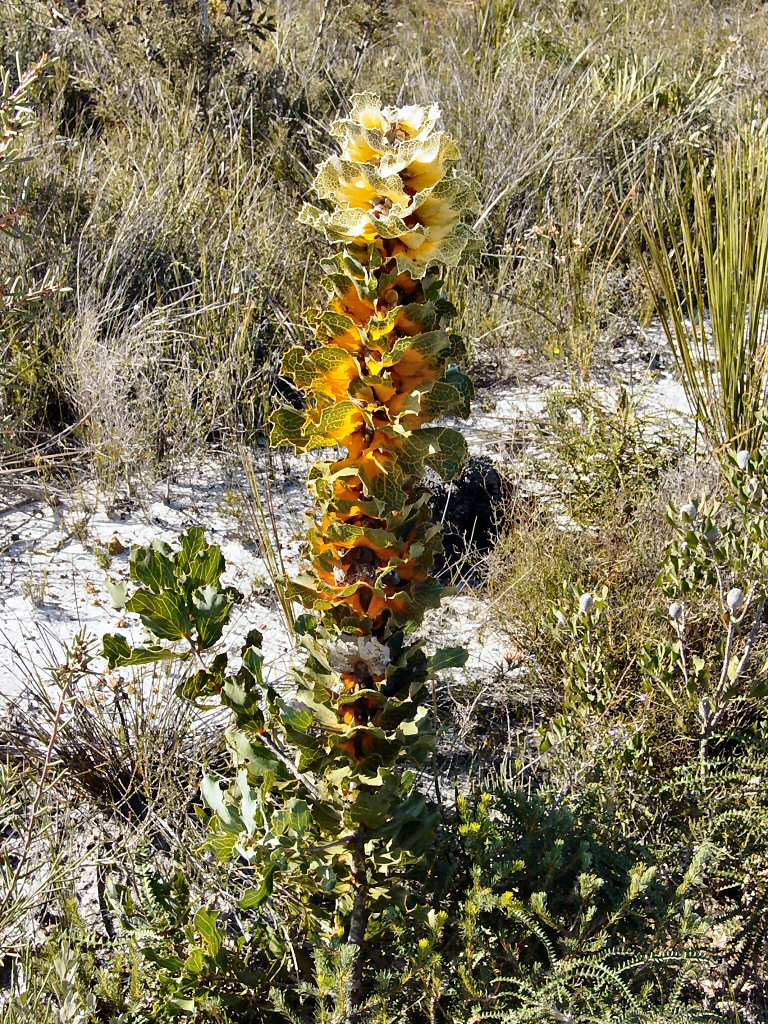
Royal Hakea

Fitzgerald River National Park is a national park in the Shires of Ravensthorpe and the Shire of Jerramungup in Western Australia, 419 kilometres (260 mi) southeast of Perth. The park is recognised on Australia's National Heritage List for its outstanding diversity of native plant species; there are 75 plant species which are unique to the 329,882 hectares (815,160 acres) park, and a further 250 are rarely found elsewhere. Although the park only occupies 0.2 percent of Western Australia's land surface, it is home to approximately 20% of the state's described plant species.

There is also an eponymous locality, stretching across the shires of Jerramungup and Ravensthorpe, but the boundaries of the national park and the locality are not identical.

== Description ==
The park includes the Barren Range (East, Middle, and West Mount Barren), the Eyre Range, the Culham Inlet, the Fitzgerald River, the Hamersley River, and the Hamersley Inlet, as well as incorporating the Fitzgerald Biosphere. The land now encompassing the Fitzgerald River National Park is part of the traditional country of the Goreng, Mineng and Wudjari (Noongar) people.

Recording almost 40,000 visitors in 2008, the park received $20 million in funding from the federal government's economic stimulus plan with the state government contributing an additional $20 million. The investment was used to redevelop and seal 80 km (50 mi) of roads within the park, construct a walking trail from Bremer Bay to Hopetoun, and upgrade existing recreational facilities.

Point Ann is one of the two places (the other is Head of the Bight) along Australia's coast where southern right whales come to calve during their winter migration. Within the National Park is the Quaalup Homestead Wilderness Retreat (now run as a hotel) that was built in 1858 by the Wellstead Family. In 1890, the Hassell family took over the pastoral lease and the homestead. The park can be accessed from the western side via Bremer Bay, or from the eastern side via Hopetoun. The central area of the park is only accessible with a four-wheel-drive vehicle or on foot. Many of the peaks in the park are off limits to climbers to prevent the spread of dieback or root rot from Phytophthora cinnamomi.

The northwest precinct of the park is referred to as Twertup, a name applied to several plants and features of the landscape. The Twertup Field Studies Centre, so named, previously occupied a former residence known as Twertup Cottage until the spongolite construction was destroyed by fire. Twertup is given in formal names associated with the area, for the watercourse Twertup Creek, a road, and several plant taxa, the Twertup mallee Eucalyptus arborella, Twertup feather-flower Verticordia crebra, and Leucopogon sp. Twertup for an unknown species described by K.R. Newbey that was found in the area. The nineteenth century author Ethel Hassell, who lived nearby at Jerramungup station, gives a chapter with this title. A warning that the young woman should avoid staying in the area, while heeded, was mysterious about the actual threat. This was later explained by Hassel's Nyungar friend, Gimbuck, who now advised her to sleep with two fires and away from water because of the reputation of groups of 'wild dogs' (dingos) in the area; this practical concern was accompanied by the ancestral story of their abundance.

In February 2023, a Coulson Aviation Boeing 737-300 crashed while fighting fires in the national park; both pilots survived the crash.

== Flora and fauna ==
The park forms the basis of the internationally recognised Biosphere Reserve recognised by the UNESCO Man and the Biosphere Programme. The park's floral inventory lists 1748 taxa of plants with 250 of these being rare and 75 being known to be found only within the confines of the park. Some species of interest include the royal hakea, Qualup bell, scarlet banksia, showy banksia, bell-fruit mallee, pea flowers, featherflowers, many species of eucalypts and bottlebrushes (Callistemon and Beaufortia).

Three populations of the crowned mallee all exist within the park and have a total number of 140 trees. An endangered species, Boronia clavata, has five populations totalling only 100 individuals all of which are located in the area. Another two endangered species, the barrens wedding bush and the fan-leaf grevillea, are also found within the park although in the case of the barrens wedding bush, not exclusively.

The park is also home to 22 species of mammal, 200 bird species, 41 species of reptile and 12 species of frog. It is recognised as an Important Bird Area; some of the rarer species are the western bristlebird, western ground parrot and the western whipbird. The endangered malleefowl is also known to inhabit the park with seven known and recorded sightings having been made in 1998. Some of the mammals found are the very rare dibbler and the heath rat, both of which were thought to be extinct at one time or another. The tammar wallaby and woylie, both of which are threatened species, are known to inhabit the mallee and heath areas of the park. Other species such as the quenda, chuditch and the red-tailed phascogale also inhabit the area.

Migratory birds find refuge in the wetland and coastal regions and species that temporarily inhabit the area include the white-bellied sea eagle, Pacific swift, and the Caspian tern.

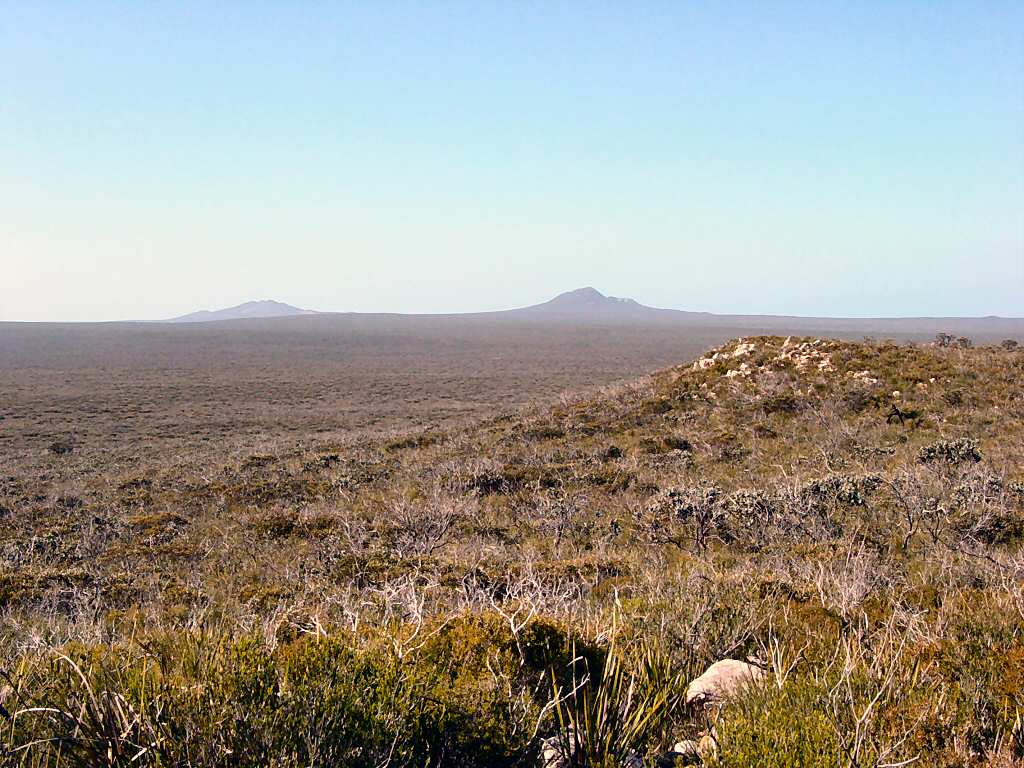
Barren Mountain Range

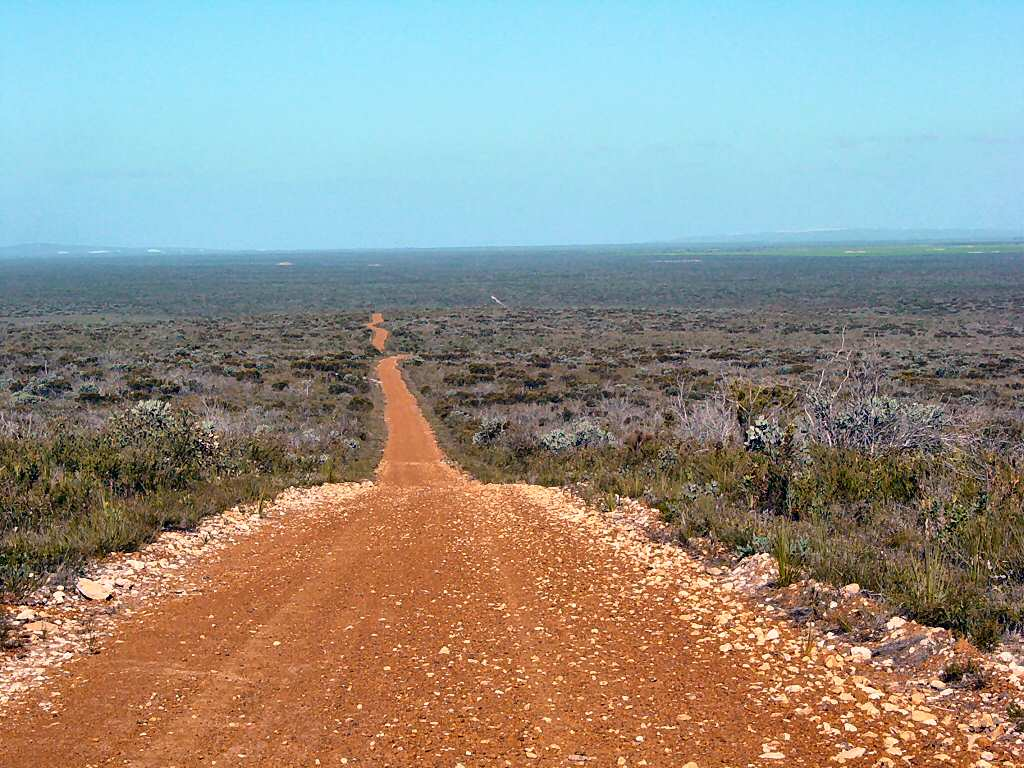
Looking south towards the coast

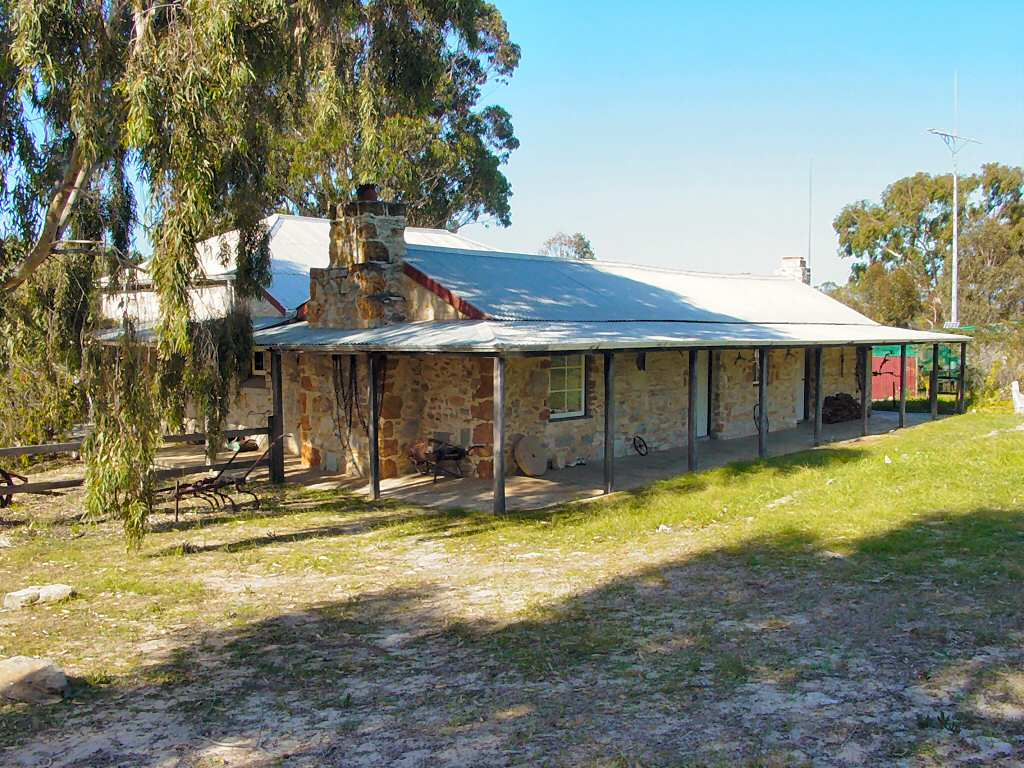
Quaalup Homestead

== See also ==
- Protected areas of Western Australia
- List of biosphere reserves in Australia
