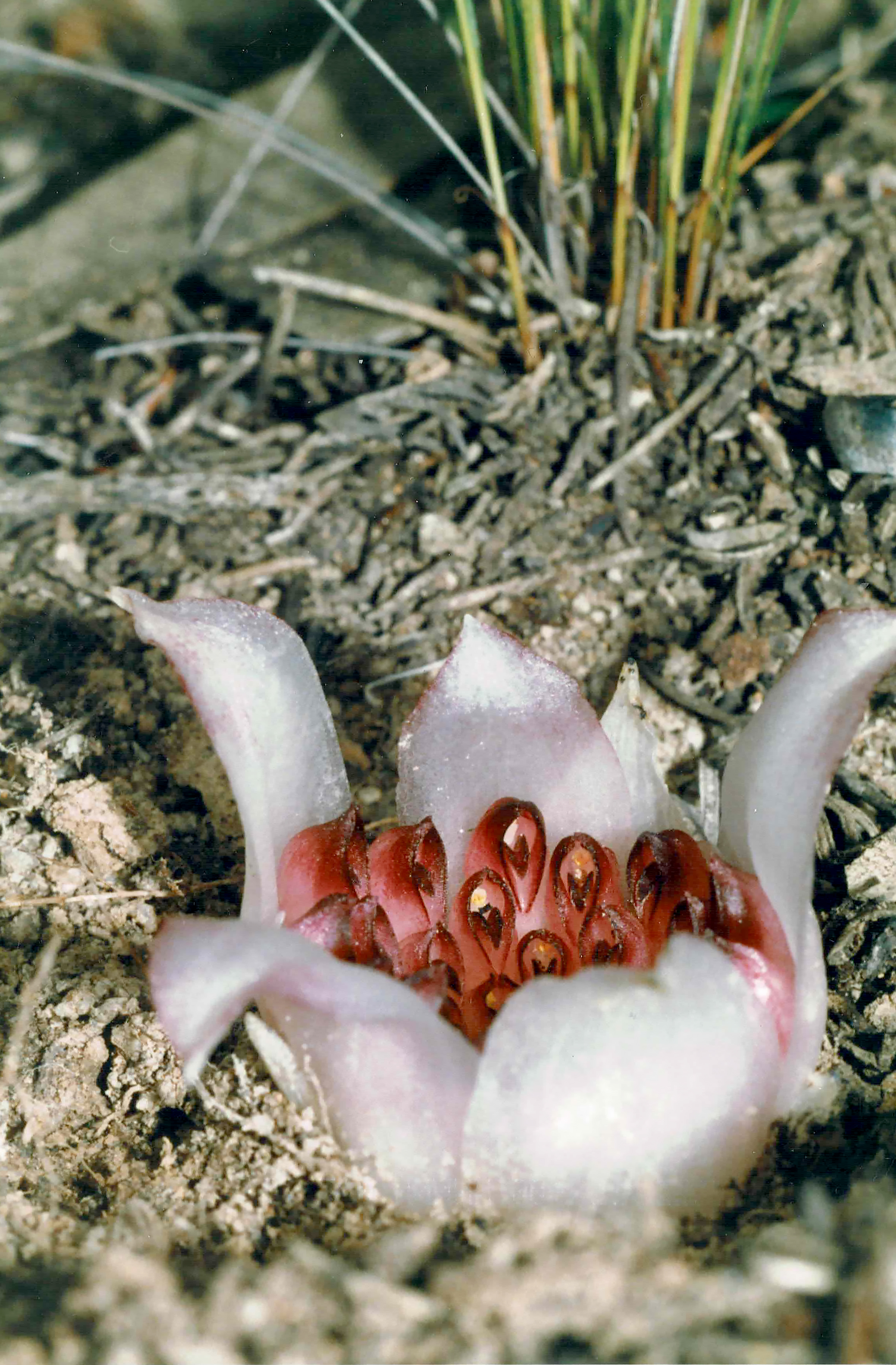

Conservation status
- Declared rare (DEC)

Scientific classification
- Kingdom: Plantae
- Clade: Tracheophytes
- Clade: Angiosperms
- Clade: Monocots
- Order: Asparagales
- Family: Orchidaceae
- Subfamily: Orchidoideae
- Tribe: Diurideae
- Genus: Rhizanthella
- Species: R. johnstonii

Binomial name
- Rhizanthella johnstonii K.W.Dixon & Christenh.

= Rhizanthella johnstonii =

South coast underground orchid

Species of orchid

Rhizanthella johnstonii, commonly known as south coast underground orchid, is a species of flowering plant in the orchid family and is endemic to the southwest of Western Australia. It is a subterranean herb that has a horizontal rhizome and a head of up to sixty small white flowers with a pink tinge, surrounded by relatively large, cream-coloured to pale pinkish cream bracts.

== Description ==
Rhizanthella johnstonii is a leafless, sympodial, subterranean herb with a horizontal rhizome 60–120 mm (2.4–4.7 in) below the soil surface with an erect peduncle up to 60 cm (24 in) long. Up to sixty small, white flowers tinged with pink are arranged in eight to twelve spiral rows, each with six to eight flowers 4–5 mm (0.16–0.20 in) wide, surrounded by six to eight cream-coloured to pale pinkish cream bracts. In other respects, it is similar to R. gardneri.

== Taxonomy and naming ==
Rhizanthella johnstonii was first formally described in 2018 by Kingsley Dixon and Maarten Christenhusz in the journal Phytotaxa from specimens collected near a tributary of the Oldfield River by Alex George in 1979. The specific epithet (johnstonii) honours Lionel Johnston for his support to the author Dixon.

== Distribution and habitat ==
Rhizanthella johnstonii is only known from the area around Munglinup where it grows in association with Melaleuca uncinata, M. hamata and an unnamed melaleuca of the M. uncinata complex.

== Ecology ==
As with other orchids in the genus Rhizanthella, all parts of the life cycle of R. gardneri, including flowering, are subterranean. The orchid obtains its energy and nutrients as a myco-heterotroph via mycorrhizal fungi (Ceratobasidium sp.).

== Conservation status ==
Rhizanthella johnstonii is listed as "Threatened Flora (Declared Rare Flora — Extant)" by the Department of Environment and Conservation (Western Australia) and has been nominated for listing as "critically endangered" under the Australian Government Environment Protection and Biodiversity Conservation Act 1999.
