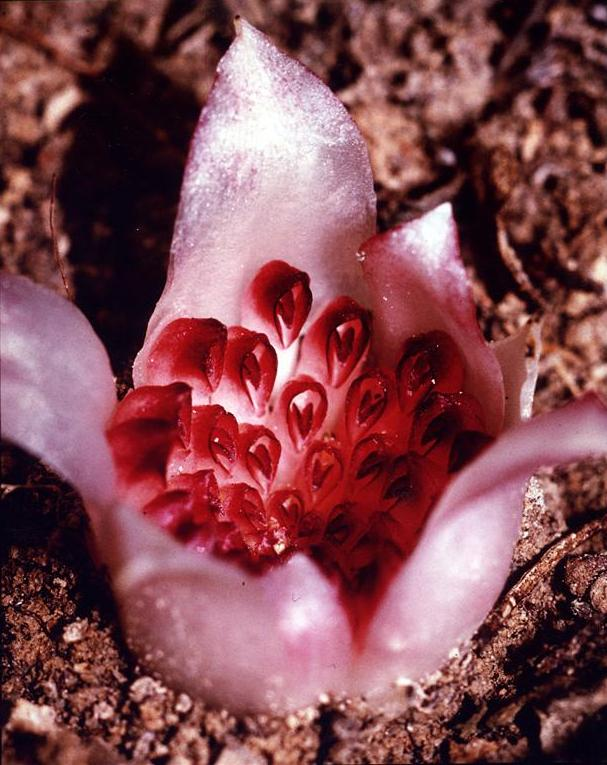
- Rhizanthella gardneri

Conservation status
- Critically endangered (EPBC Act)

Scientific classification
- Kingdom: Plantae
- Clade: Tracheophytes
- Clade: Angiosperms
- Clade: Monocots
- Order: Asparagales
- Family: Orchidaceae
- Subfamily: Orchidoideae
- Tribe: Diurideae
- Genus: Rhizanthella
- Species: R. gardneri

Binomial name
- Rhizanthella gardneri R.S.Rogers

= Rhizanthella gardneri =

Western underground orchid

Species of orchid plant

Rhizanthella gardneri, commonly known as western underground orchid, is a species of flowering plant in the orchid family and is endemic to the southwest of Western Australia. It is a herb that spends its entire life cycle, including flowering, at or below the soil surface. A head of up to 100 small reddish to cream-coloured, inward facing flowers surrounded by large, cream-coloured bracts with a horizontal rhizome is produced between May and July.

== Description ==
Rhizanthella gardneri is a leafless, sympodial herb with a horizontal rhizome 60–120 mm (2.4–4.7 in) below the soil surface. Beginning in late May to early June, the plant produces up to 100 small, inward-facing pinkish to deep red and cream coloured flowers 4–5 mm (0.16–0.20 in) wide, surrounded by six to twelve pinkish-cream bracts. The bracts curve over the flowers, forming a tulip-like head and leaving a small opening at, or a few millimetres above the soil surface. After pollination, each flower produces a fleshy, berry-like fruit containing up to 150 seeds. Unlike the capsules of other orchids that produce minute, dust-like seeds dispersed by the wind, this species produces indehiscent fruit.

== Discovery, taxonomy and naming ==
John Trott discovered the first specimen of R. gardneri during ploughing operations in May 1928 on his farm near Corrigin. The discovery generated such excitement that a wax model was toured around the British Isles. Specimens were found a further six times in similar circumstances between the Corrigin and Dowerin areas, until 1959. The next confirmed sighting was by John McGuiness near Munglinup in 1979, of plants in their natural habitat. In 1981 and 1982, surveys in the Munglinup area located more than one hundred flowering specimens. The Munglinup population is now regarded as the separate species, Rhizanthella johnstonii.

Rhizanthella gardneri was first formally described in 1928 by Richard Sanders Rogers in the Journal of the Royal Society of Western Australia from specimens collected near Corrigin in May of the same year. The specific epithet (gardneri) honours Charles Gardner, assistant botanist to the Western Australian Government at that time.

== Distribution and habitat ==
Rhizanthella gardneri is only known from the Avon Wheatbelt biogeographic region of Western Australia, where it grows in association with broom honeymyrtle (Melaleuca uncinata), between Corrigin and Babakin.

== Ecology ==
As with other orchids in the genus Rhizanthella, all parts of the life cycle of R. gardneri, including flowering, are subterranean. The orchid obtains its energy and nutrients as a myco-heterotroph via mycorrhizal fungi that form associations with the roots of broombush species including M. uncinata, M. scalena and M. hamata. The fungus involved is thought to be Thanatephorus gardneri.

The flowers of R. gardneri are subterranean but the heads crack open the soil surface as they mature, and sometimes the tips of the bracts protrude through the leaf litter, leaving a small opening through which pollinators may enter. Termites and ants have been seen to enter the flower heads. The orchid's seeds are too large to be dispersed by the wind and it is possible that the succulent fruit is eaten by small mammals and the seeds passed out of their faeces.

== Conservation status ==
The species is classified as "critically endangered" under the Australian Government Environment Protection and Biodiversity Conservation Act 1999 and as "Threatened Flora (Declared Rare Flora — Extant)" by the Department of Environment and Conservation (Western Australia).

Much of the central and southern Wheatbelt of Western Australia has been cleared for agriculture, or affected by drought, resulting in the loss of broombush habitat or a reduction in the level of bark and leaf litter necessary to protect the underground orchid and a reduction in the area suitable for translocation. The main threats to the species include lack of suitable habitat, degraded habitat, drought and rising soil salinity.

Three of the known populations of Rhizanthella gardneri are protected within nature reserves, and a concerted initiative has been launched to safeguard this species for future generations. A partnership between the Millennium Seed Bank of the Royal Botanic Gardens, Kew, Australia's Endangered Species Program and Perth's Kings Park and Botanic Gardens are undertaking DNA fingerprinting and seed-banking of this rare orchid in an attempt to establish a propagation programme.
