= Calytrix viscida =

Conservation status
- Declared rare (DEC)

Scientific classification
- Kingdom: Plantae
- Clade: Tracheophytes
- Clade: Angiosperms
- Clade: Eudicots
- Clade: Rosids
- Order: Myrtales
- Family: Myrtaceae
- Genus: Calytrix
- Species: C. viscida

Binomial name
- Calytrix viscida Rye

Species of flowering plant

Calytrix viscida is a species of flowering plant in the myrtle family, Myrtaceae and is endemic to inland areas of Western Australia. It is a shrub with oblong to narrowly oblong leaves and pink star-shaped flowers with 15 to 18 stamens in a single row.

== Description ==
Calytrix viscida is a shrub that typically grows to a height of 50 cm (20 in) and has glabrous young stems. Its leaves are oblong to narrowly oblong, 2.5–4 mm (0.098–0.157 in) long and 0.6–1 mm (0.024–0.039 in) wide on a petiole 0.4–0.6 mm (0.016–0.024 in) long, with stipules present on young leaves. The flowers are 10–15 mm (0.39–0.59 in) in diameter, on a peduncle 2–3 mm (0.079–0.118 in) long with bracteoles joined at the base for 5–7 mm (0.20–0.28 in) long. The floral tube is 8–9 mm (0.31–0.35 in) long and has five ribs. The sepals are egg-shaped, 10–13 mm (0.39–0.51 in) long and glabrous with an awn 9–11 mm (0.35–0.43 in) long. The petals are pink with a yellow base, 6–7 mm (0.24–0.28 in) long, and there are about 15 to 18 stamens in a single row, the filaments bright yellow 4–5 mm (0.16–0.20 in) long. Flowering has been recorded in August and September.

== Taxonomy ==
Calytrix viscida was first formally described in 2013 by Barbara Lynette Rye in the journal Nuytsia from specimens collected on the Jackson Range in 2006. The specific epithet (viscida) means "sticky" and refers to the bracteoles.

== Distribution and habitat ==
This species of Calytrix grows on a duricrust rise and in shallow soil with ironstone gravel, with Melaleuca hamata and M.leiocarpa in the Coolgardie bioregion of inland Western Australia.

== Conservation status ==
Calytrix viscida is listed as "Threatened Flora (Declared Rare Flora — Extant)" by the Department of Environment and Conservation (Western Australia) meaning that it is likely to become extinct or is rare, or otherwise in need of special protection.
