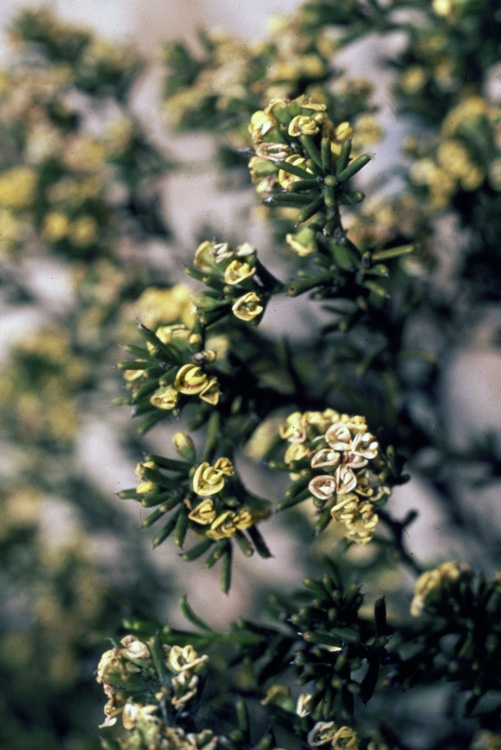

Scientific classification
- Kingdom: Plantae
- Clade: Tracheophytes
- Clade: Angiosperms
- Clade: Eudicots
- Clade: Rosids
- Order: Fabales
- Family: Fabaceae
- Subfamily: Faboideae
- Genus: Daviesia
- Species: D. campephylla

Binomial name
- Daviesia campephylla Crisp

= Daviesia campephylla =

Species of flowering plant

Daviesia campephylla is a species of flowering plant in the family Fabaceae and is endemic to a restricted part of Western Australia. It is a low, spreading shrub with ascending branches, phyllodes shaped like looping caterpillars, and yellow flowers with faint red markings.

== Description ==
Daviesia campephylla is a spreading, often domed shrub that typically grows to 15–35 cm (5.9–13.8 in) high and 0.3–1.0 mm (0.012–0.039 in) wide with rough-textured branchlets and phyllodes. Its leaves are reduced to irregularly bent phyllodes often resembling looping caterpillars or s-shaped, mostly 6–16 mm (0.24–0.63 in) long and 1–2 mm (0.039–0.079 in) wide. The flowers are arranged in groups of up to five in leaf axils on a peduncle up to 1 mm (0.039 in) long, each flower on a pedicel 1–4 mm (0.039–0.157 in) long with egg-shaped or oblong bracts about 1 mm (0.039 in) long at the base. The sepals are 3–5 mm (0.12–0.20 in) long and joined at the base, the upper lobes joined for most of their length and the lower three triangular and about 1 mm (0.039 in) long. The flowers are mainly yellow with faint red markings, the standard broadly egg-shaped, 5.5–7.0 mm (0.22–0.28 in) long and 5–7 mm (0.20–0.28 in) wide. The wings are spatula-shaped and 5–6 mm (0.20–0.24 in) long and the keel 5.0–5.5 mm (0.20–0.22 in) long. Flowering occurs in November and the fruit is a thin-walled pod 5–7 mm (0.20–0.28 in) long.

== Taxonomy and naming ==
Daviesia campephylla was first formally described in 1995 by Michael Crisp in Australian Systematic Botany from specimens collected by Ken Newbey near Munglinup in 1980. The specific epithet (campephylla) means "caterpillar-leaved".

== Distribution and habitat ==
This species of pea grows in a restricted area between Cascade, the Oldfield River and Munglinup on roadsides and nearby mallee in the Mallee biogeographic region of south-western Western Australia.

== Conservation status ==
Daviesia campephylla is classified as "not threatened" by the Department of Biodiversity, Conservation and Attractions.
