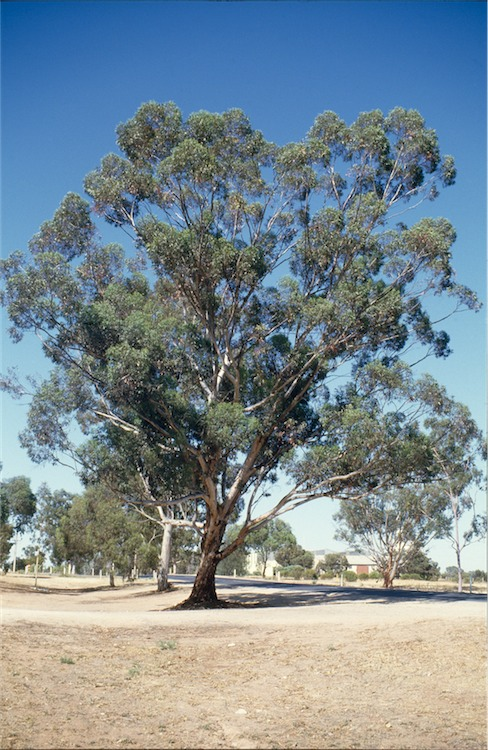
- Near Loxton, South Australia

Conservation status
- Least Concern (IUCN 3.1)

Scientific classification
- Kingdom: Plantae
- Clade: Tracheophytes
- Clade: Angiosperms
- Clade: Eudicots
- Clade: Rosids
- Order: Myrtales
- Family: Myrtaceae
- Genus: Eucalyptus
- Species: E. astringens

Binomial name
- Eucalyptus astringens (Maiden) Maiden

= Eucalyptus astringens =

Brown mallet

Species of eucalyptus

Eucalyptus astringens, commonly known as brown mallet or to Noongar people as mallat, woonert or wurnert, is a tree that is endemic to the South West region of Western Australia. It has smooth, shiny bark on its trunk and branches, lance-shaped leaves, pendulous flower buds arranged in groups of seven, cream-coloured to pale lemon-coloured flowers and cup-shaped to bell-shaped or conical fruit. This tree has also been introduced to Victoria.

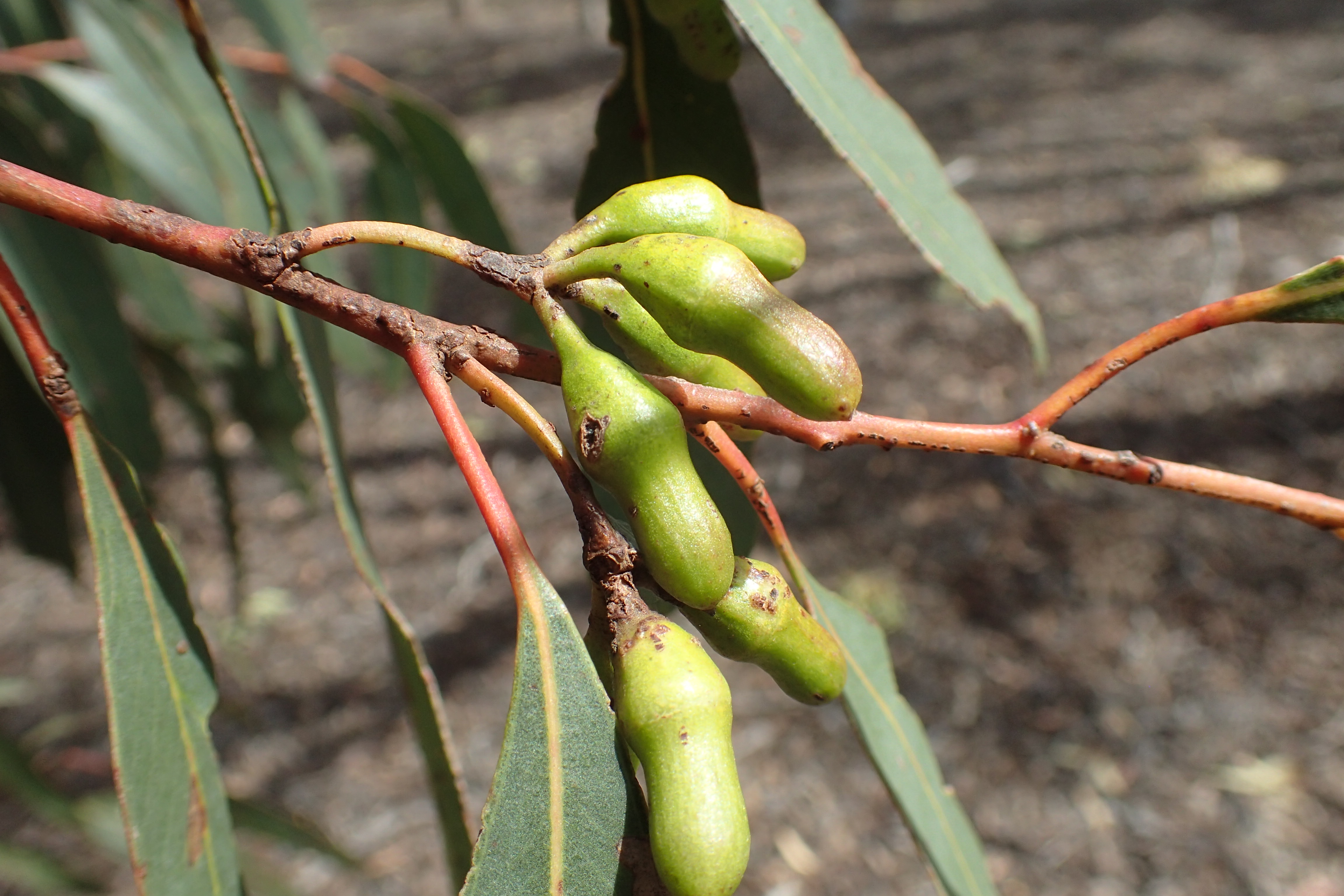
Flower buds

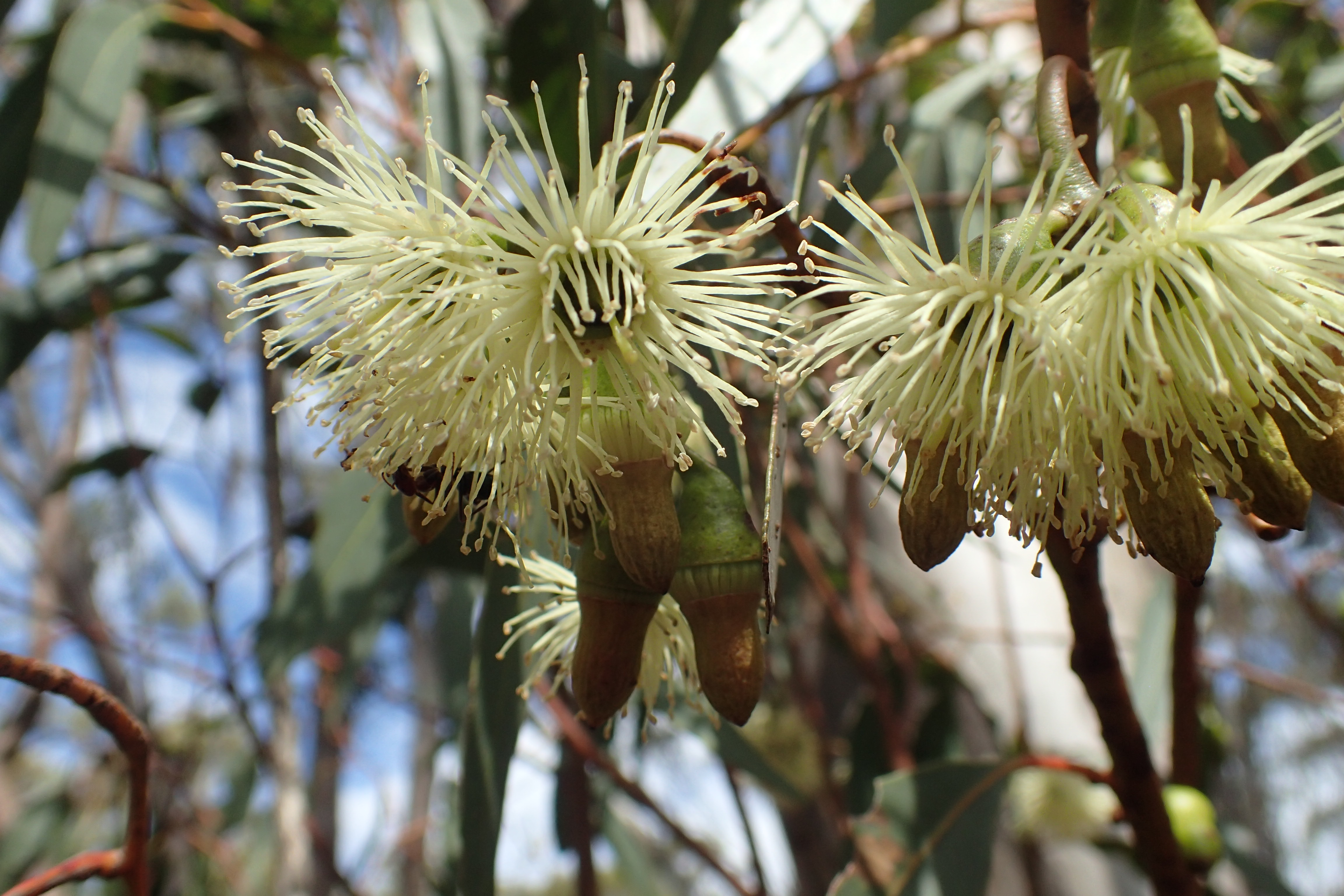
Flowers

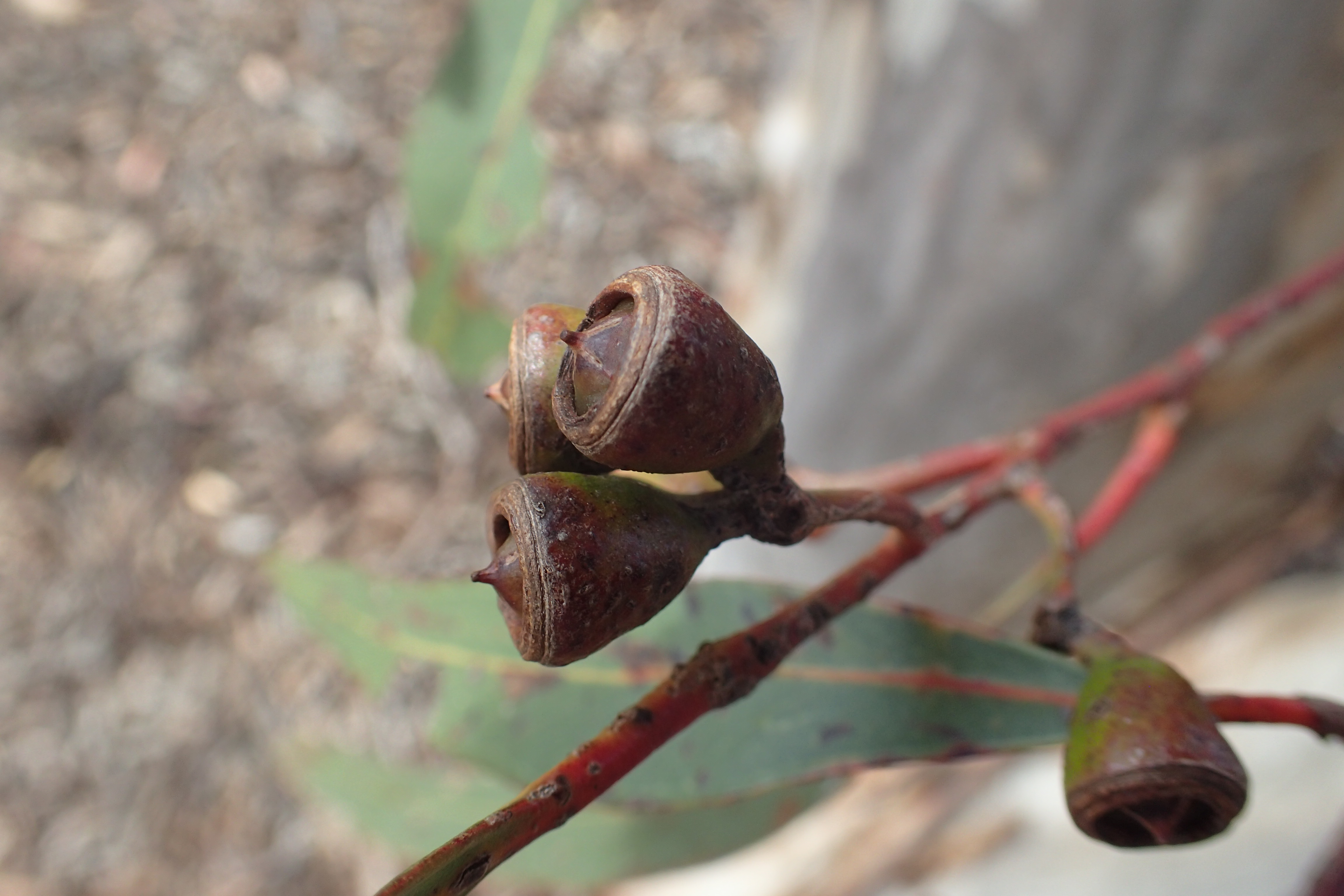
Fruit

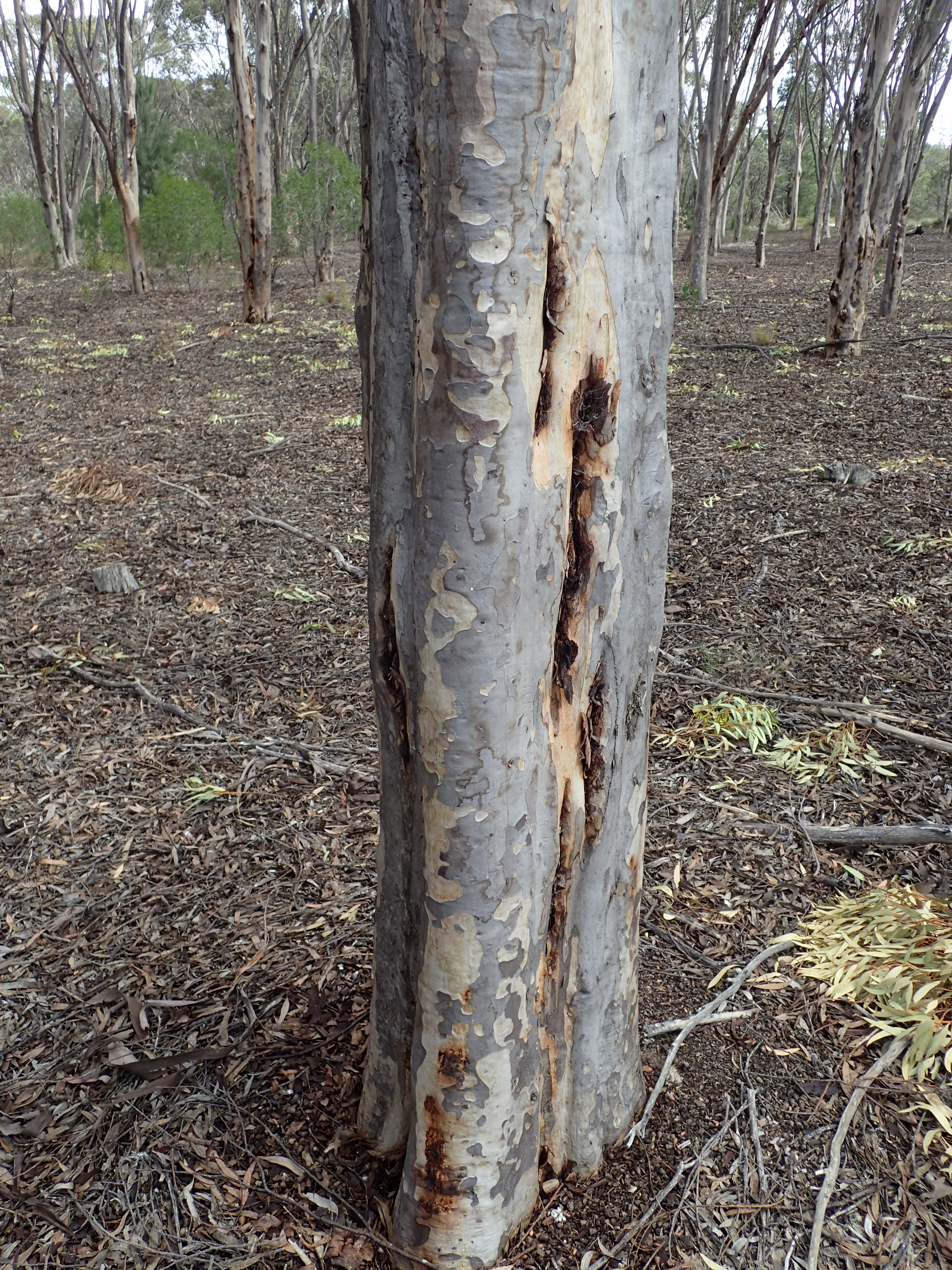
Bark

== Description ==
The tree typically grows to a height of 1.5 to 15 metres (5 to 49 ft) and can get to 24 m (79 ft) tall and lacks a lignotuber. The trunk has a dbh of around 7 m (23 ft). It has smooth, grey-brown bark that peels from the trunk and branches. The leaves are arranged alternately and are lance-shaped, rarely sickle-shaped, 60–140 mm (2.4–5.5 in) long and 10–35 mm (0.39–1.38 in) wide on a petiole 10–25 mm (0.39–0.98 in) long. Both sides of the leaves are the same shade of glossy green. The flower buds are arranged in umbels of seven on a flattened peduncle 12–32 mm (0.47–1.26 in) long, each bud on a pedicel 2–9 mm (0.079–0.354 in) long. The mature buds are stubby to slightly elongated, 15–20 mm (0.59–0.79 in) long and 5–7 mm (0.20–0.28 in) wide with a blunt, horn-shaped operculum up to about twice the length of the hypanthium. Flowering occurs from August to December and the flowers are creamy white to pale lemon yellow. The fruit is a cup-shaped to bell-shaped or inverted cone-shaped capsule, 7–12 mm (0.28–0.47 in) long and 6–10 mm (0.24–0.39 in) wide.

== Taxonomy ==
Brown mallet was first formally described in 1911 by Joseph Maiden, who gave it the name Eucalyptus occidentalis var. astringens and published the description in the Journal of the Natural History and Science Society of Western Australia. In 1924, Maiden raised the variety to species status in his book A Critical Revision of the Genus Eucalyptus. The specific epithet (astringens) is a Latin word meaning "shrinking" or "binding".

In 2002, Ian Brooker and Stephen Hopper described two subspecies:

- Eucalyptus astringens subsp. astringens is a taller mallet with flower buds usually longer than 15 millimetres (1 in);
- Eucalyptus astringens subsp. redacta is a smaller mallet with smaller buds and fruit than the autonym.

== Distribution ==
Brown mallet is commonly found on rocky outcrops, ridges, breakaways, hills and on valley floors in the southern Wheatbelt, Great Southern and south west Goldfields-Esperance regions of Western Australia. It grows in red-brown gravelly clay, brown clayey sand, sandy loam, spongolite, laterite and sandstone based soils.

It is commonly associated with E. wandoo making up the overstorey, especially when E. wandoo woodland is an adjacent community. Understorey species often include occasional Santalum acuminatum and Melaleuca scalena, and a sparse ground cover of common grasses and herbs such as Thysanotus patersonii, Trachymene pilosa, Pterostylis sanguineus, Austrostipa elegantissima, Austrodanthonia setacea group and Lomandra micrantha subsp. micrantha.

E. astringens has become naturalised in Bacchus Marsh, north of Melbourne, in Victoria, where it had been used to stabilise soils.

== Uses ==
The wood from the tree is used for construction, mining timbers and for tool handles. It is also a good firewood. The bark contains around 40% tannin and was used and exported for tanning leather and the production of adhesives. Around 8,000 hectares (19,768 acres) of the trees have been planted around Narrogin in plantations for timber production.

== See also ==
- List of Eucalyptus species
