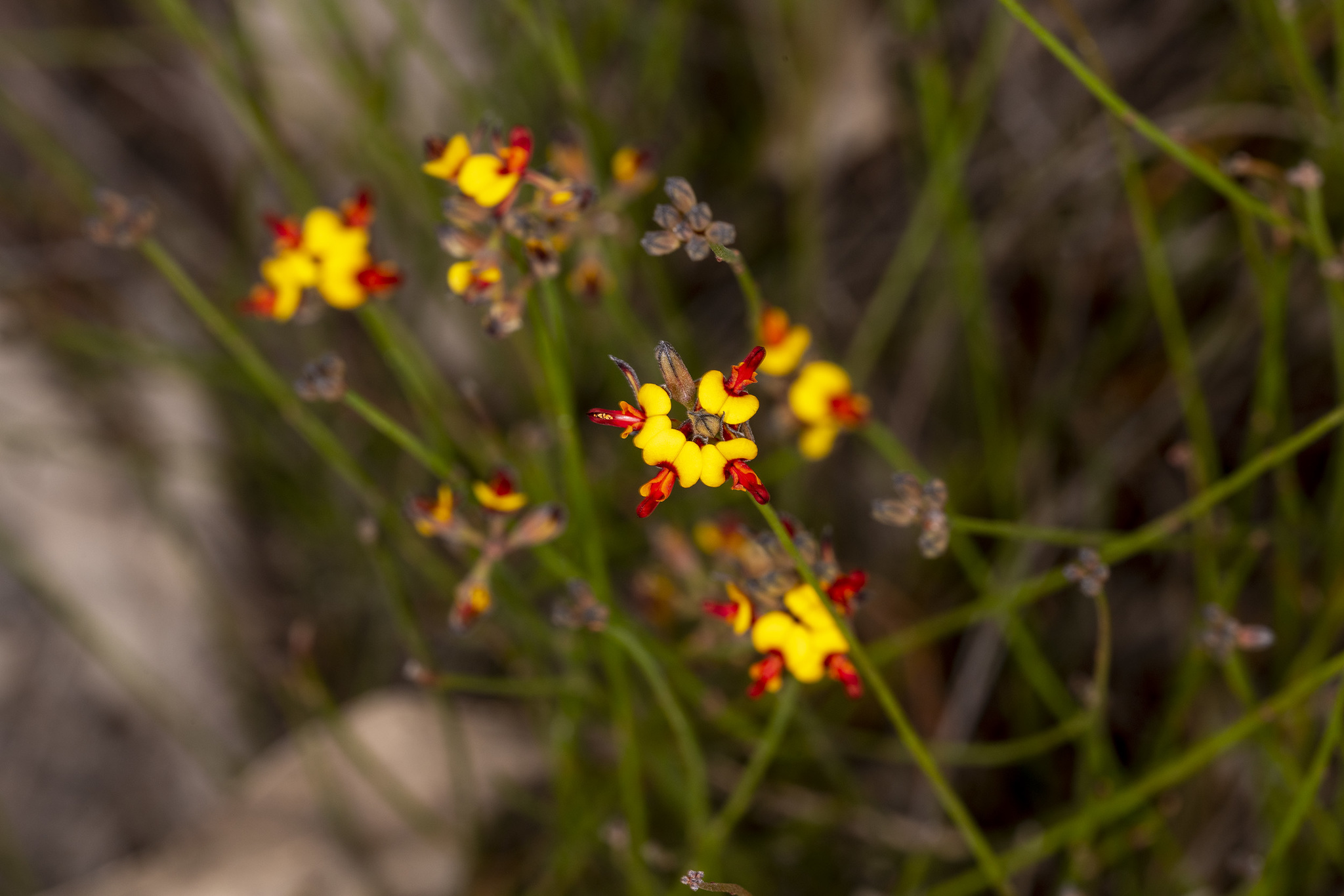
- Near Helms Arboretum, north of Esperance

Scientific classification
- Kingdom: Plantae
- Clade: Tracheophytes
- Clade: Angiosperms
- Clade: Eudicots
- Clade: Rosids
- Order: Fabales
- Family: Fabaceae
- Subfamily: Faboideae
- Genus: Jacksonia
- Species: J. humilis

Binomial name
- Jacksonia humilis Chappill

= Jacksonia humilis =

Species of legume

Jacksonia humilis is a species of flowering plant in the family Fabaceae and is endemic to the south of Western Australia. It is a spreading to prostrate shrub with dull green branches, sharply-pointed phylloclades, yellow-orange flowers with red markings, and membranous, densely-hairy pods.

== Description ==
Jacksonia humilis is a delicate, spreading to prostrate shrub that typically grows to 0.05–1 m (2.0 in – 3 ft 3.4 in) high and 0.3–0.4 m (1 ft 0 in – 1 ft 4 in) wide, its branches dull green and ribbed. Its end branches are sharply-pointed phylloclades, the leaves reduced to dark brown, egg-shaped scales, 0.9–1.9 mm (0.035–0.075 in) long and 0.6–0.9 mm (0.024–0.035 in) wide with toothed edges. The flowers are scattered along the branches, each flower on a pedicel 1.0–1.8 mm (0.039–0.071 in) long. There are egg-shaped bracteoles 0.9–1.3 mm (0.035–0.051 in) long and 0.45–0.6 mm (0.018–0.024 in) wide on the pedicels. The floral tube is 0.5–0.7 mm (0.020–0.028 in) long and the sepals are membranous, the lobes 5.2–5.7 mm (0.20–0.22 in) long, 1.6–1.9 mm (0.063–0.075 in) wide and fused at the base. The standard petal is yellow-orange with red markings, 5.6–5.9 mm (0.22–0.23 in) long and 6.7–7.0 mm (0.26–0.28 in) deep, the wings yellow, yellow-orange with red markings, 5.8–6.0 mm (0.23–0.24 in) long, and the keel is dark red, 5.5–5.6 mm (0.22–0.22 in) long. The stamens have dark red filaments, 3.3–5.7 mm (0.13–0.22 in) long. Flowering occurs from September to November, and the fruit is a membranous, densely hairy, elliptic pod, 4.7–5.0 mm (0.19–0.20 in) long and 3.0–3.3 mm (0.12–0.13 in) wide.

== Taxonomy ==
Jacksonia humilis was first formally described in 2007 by Jennifer Anne Chappill in Australian Systematic Botany from specimens collected 40 km (25 mi) east of Jerramungup in 1992. The specific epithet (humilis) means 'low' or 'small'.

== Distribution and habitat ==
This species of Jacksonia grows in woodland in sand or sandy clay between the southern Stirling Range to Munglinup in the Esperance Plains, Jarrah Forest and Mallee bioregions of southern Western Australia.

== Conservation status ==
Jacksonia humilis is listed as "not threatened" by the Government of Western Australia Department of Parks and Wildlife.
