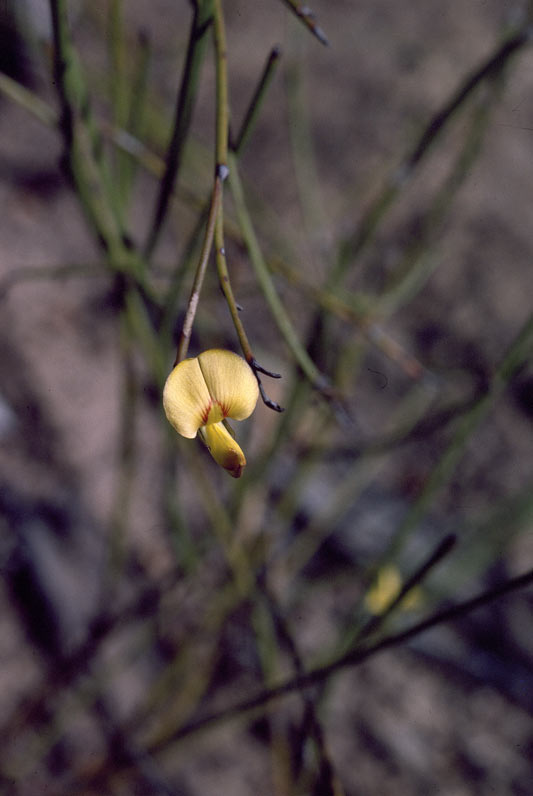
- Near Munglinup

Scientific classification
- Kingdom: Plantae
- Clade: Tracheophytes
- Clade: Angiosperms
- Clade: Eudicots
- Clade: Rosids
- Order: Fabales
- Family: Fabaceae
- Subfamily: Faboideae
- Genus: Daviesia
- Species: D. anceps

Binomial name
- Daviesia anceps Turcz.

= Daviesia anceps =

Species of flowering plant

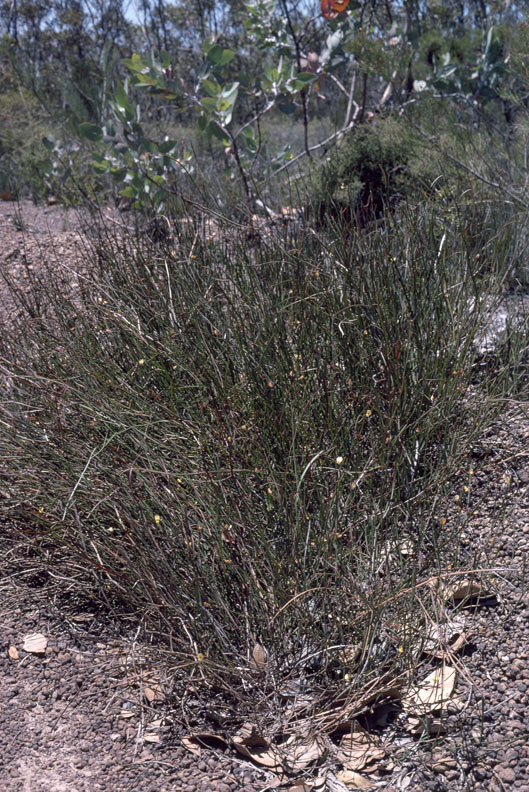
Habit, near Ravensthorpe

Daviesia anceps is a species of flowering plant in the family Fabaceae and is endemic to the south of Western Australia. It is a dense, erect or low-lying shrub with its branchlets reduced to flattened cladodes, and yellow flowers with red markings.

== Description ==
Daviesia anceps is a dense, glabrous, erect or low-lying shrub that typically grows to a height of 50 cm (20 in). Its branchlets are reduced to flattened cladodes 1–2 mm (0.039–0.079 in) wide and the leaves reduced to small scales. The flowers are arranged singly in upper scale-leaves on a pedicel 2–3 mm (0.079–0.118 in) long. The five sepals are 6–7 mm (0.24–0.28 in) long and joined at the base, the lobes 2.5–4 mm (0.098–0.157 in) long, the two upper lobes joined in a broad "lip" and the lower three triangular. The standard petal is broadly elliptic, yellow with red markings and a yellow centre and 18.0–8.5 mm (0.71–0.33 in) long, the wings yellow and about 7.5 mm (0.30 in) long and the keel yellow and the same length as the wings. Flowering mainly occurs from November to January and the fruit is an inflated triangular pod 7–9 mm (0.28–0.35 in) long.

== Taxonomy and naming ==
Daviesia anceps was first formally described in 1853 by Nikolai Turczaninow in the Bulletin de la Société Impériale des Naturalistes de Moscou. The specific epithet (anceps) means "flattened".

== Distribution and habitat ==
This species of pea mainly grows in mallee and heathland around Ravensthorpe and in the Fitzgerald River National Park.

== Conservation status ==
Daviesia anceps is classified as "not threatened" by the Government of Western Australia Department of Biodiversity, Conservation and Attractions.
