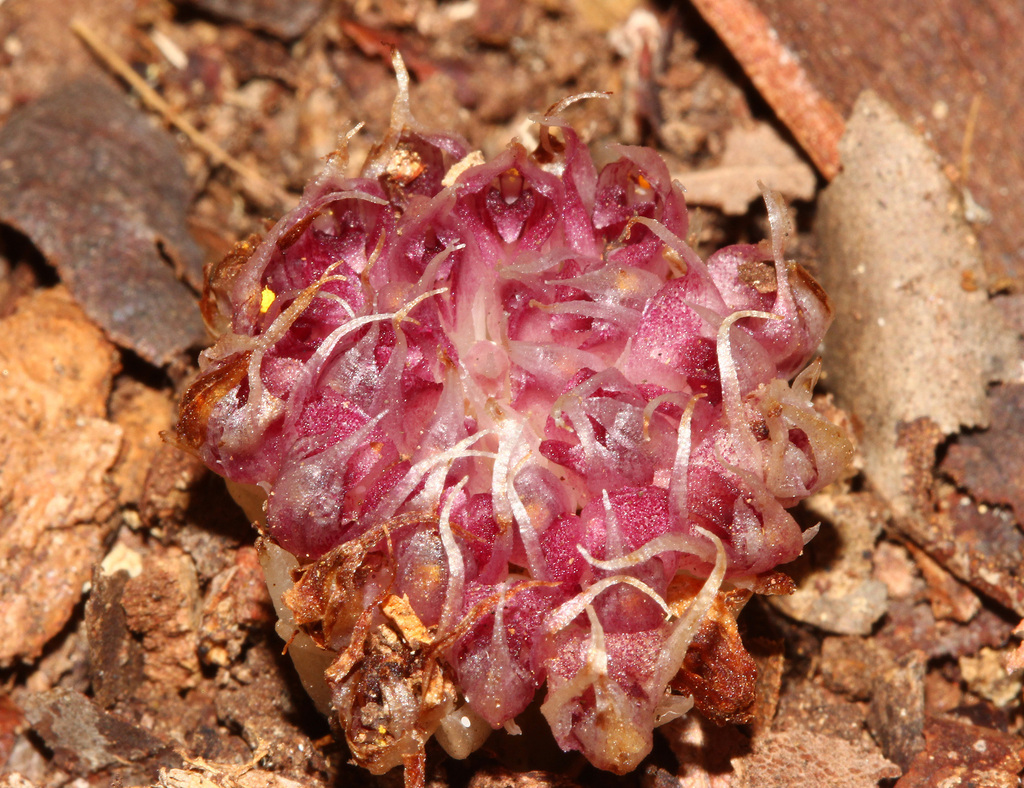
- At Barrington Tops

Scientific classification
- Kingdom: Plantae
- Clade: Tracheophytes
- Clade: Angiosperms
- Clade: Monocots
- Order: Asparagales
- Family: Orchidaceae
- Subfamily: Orchidoideae
- Tribe: Diurideae
- Genus: Rhizanthella
- Species: R. speciosa

Binomial name
- Rhizanthella speciosa M.A.Clem. & D.L.Jones

= Rhizanthella speciosa =

Species of orchid

Rhizanthella speciosa is a species of flowering plant in the orchid family and is endemic to Barrington Tops in New South Wales. It is a mycoheterotrophic herb that spends its entire life cycle, including flowering, at or below the soil surface.

== Description ==
Rhizanthella speciosa is a leafless, sympodial herb with a horizontal rhizome and underground stem probably similar to that of R. slateri. From October to early November, the plant produces a flower head 15–30 mm (0.59–1.18 in) wide containing fifteen to thirty-five flowers about 5 mm (0.20 in) in diameter. The flower heads are bright mauve to pinkish purple and are surrounded by sixteen to eighteen overlapping, fleshy, egg-shaped to triangular bracts 10–12 mm (0.39–0.47 in) long and 3–4 mm (0.12–0.16 in) wide. After pollination, the flower produces a fleshy, narrow cylindrical drupe that is pinkish to light maroon when ripe.

== Taxonomy and naming ==
This species of underground orchid was discovered in 2016 by scientific illustrator Maree Elliot and formally described in 2020 by Mark Clements and David Jones in the journal Lankesteriana from material collected in Barrington Tops National Park. The specific epithet speciosa means "showy" or "splendid".

== Distribution and habitat ==
Rhizanthella speciosa was found under dense leaf litter in tall wet sclerophyll forest of the Barrington Tops National Park with Sydney blue gum, tallowood, and turpentine, and a well-developed rainforest subcanopy with Trochocarpa laurina and Synoum glandulosum.

== Conservation status ==
As of 2020, only fifty plants in a single locality are known. The habitat where it grows is widespread, but searches have not uncovered other populations. Thus the species meets the "critically endangered" definition. The population's exact location is kept unpublished for its protection.
