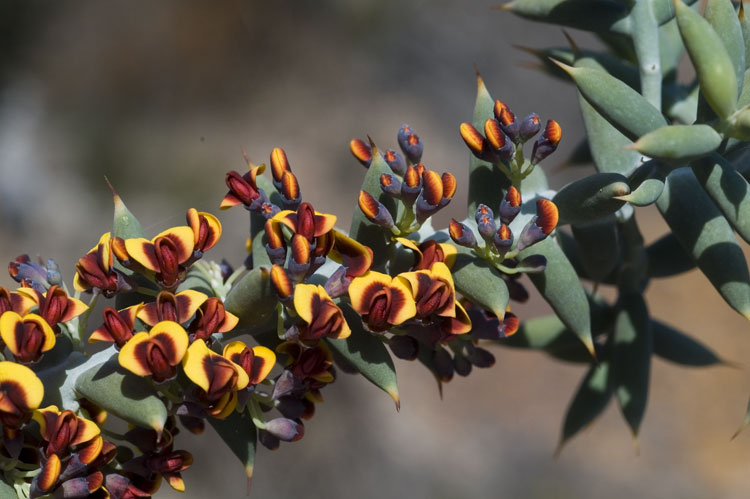
- Daviesia pachyphylla in the Fitzgerald River National Park

Scientific classification
- Kingdom: Plantae
- Clade: Tracheophytes
- Clade: Angiosperms
- Clade: Eudicots
- Clade: Rosids
- Order: Fabales
- Family: Fabaceae
- Subfamily: Faboideae
- Genus: Daviesia
- Species: D. pachyphylla

Binomial name
- Daviesia pachyphylla F.Muell.

= Daviesia pachyphylla =

Ouch bush

Species of flowering plant

Daviesia pachyphylla, commonly known as ouch bush, is a species of flowering plant in the family Fabaceae and is endemic to the south of Western Australia. It is usually a slender shrub with often arching branchlets, crowded, sharply-pointed, narrowly conical phyllodes, and yellow to orange and dark reddish-brown flowers.

== Description ==
Daviesia pachyphylla is usually a slender shrub that typically grows to a height of up to 1.5 m (4 ft 11 in) and often has arching branchlets. Its phyllodes are crowded with overlapping bases, 12–27 mm (0.47–1.06 in) long and 4–10 mm (0.16–0.39 in) wide with a sharply pointed tip. The flowers are arranged in groups of two to seven in leaf axils on a thick peduncle 0.5–5 mm (0.020–0.197 in) long, the rachis 1.25–6.0 mm (0.049–0.236 in) long with bracts 0.5–2 mm (0.020–0.079 in) long at the base. Each flower is on a pedicel 2.0–4.5 mm (0.079–0.177 in) long, the sepals 3.5–4.0 mm (0.14–0.16 in) long and joined for most of their length. The standard petal is heart-shaped, 5.5–6.0 mm (0.22–0.24 in) long and 6.5–8.0 mm (0.26–0.31 in) wide, and yellow with a dark reddish-brown centre, the wings 4.5–7.0 mm (0.18–0.28 in) long and dark reddish-brown, the keel 4–5 mm (0.16–0.20 in) long and dark reddish-brown. Flowering occurs from July to October and the fruit is a flattened, triangular pod 13–14 mm (0.51–0.55 in) long.

== Taxonomy and naming ==
Daviesia pachyphylla was first formally described in 1863 by Ferdinand von Mueller in Fragmenta Phytographiae Australiae from specimens collected by George Maxwell. The specific epithet (pachyphylla) means "thick-leaved".

== Distribution and habitat ==
Ouch bush grows in heath on laterite between the Fitzgerald River National Park, Ongerup, Ravensthorpe and Munglinup in the Esperance Plains and Mallee biogeographic regions of Southwestern Australia.

== Conservation status ==
Daviesia pachyphylla is listed as "not threatened" by the Government of Western Australia Department of Biodiversity, Conservation and Attractions.
