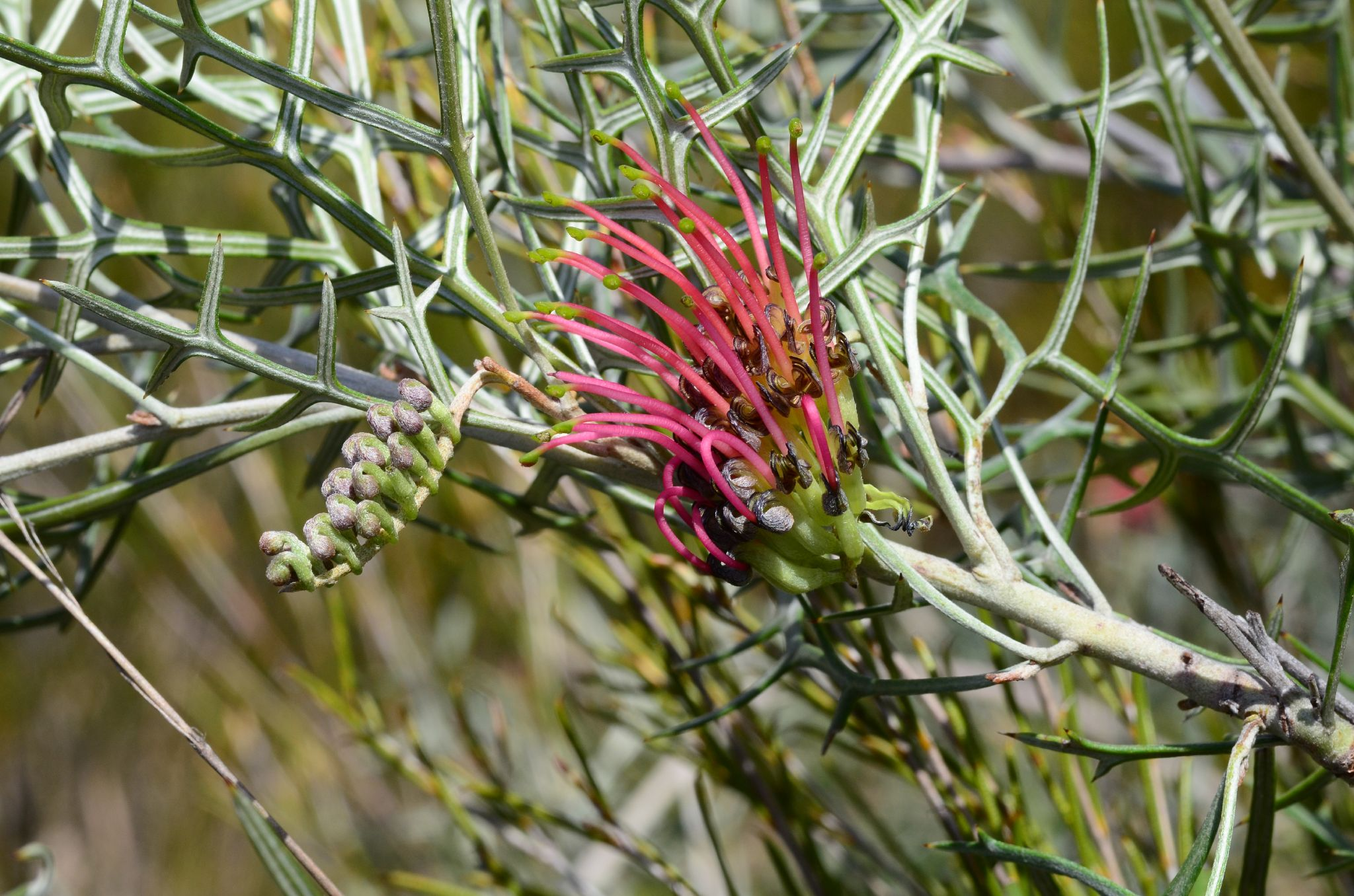
- Inflorescence and foliage

Conservation status
- Critically Endangered (IUCN 3.1)

Scientific classification
- Kingdom: Plantae
- Clade: Embryophytes
- Clade: Tracheophytes
- Clade: Spermatophytes
- Clade: Angiosperms
- Clade: Eudicots
- Order: Proteales
- Family: Proteaceae
- Genus: Grevillea
- Species: G. angustiloba

Binomial name
- Grevillea angustiloba (F.Muell.) Downing

Subspecies
- G. angustiloba subsp. angustiloba; G. angustiloba subsp. wirregaensis

= Grevillea angustiloba =

Species of plant endemic to Australia

Grevillea angustiloba, commonly known as dissected holly-leaf grevillea, is a species of flowering plant in the family Proteaceae, endemic to southern continental Australia. It is a prostrate, low-lying or erect shrub with deeply divided pinnate leaves and usually red, sometimes orange or pale yellow flowers.

== Description ==
Grevillea angustiloba is a prostrate to low-lying or erect shrub that grows up to 0.3–2 m (1 ft 0 in – 6 ft 7 in) high, 3 m (9.8 ft) wide and has hairy stems. The leaves are 35–117 mm (1.4–4.6 in) long and 19–110 mm (0.75–4.33 in) wide in outline, deeply divided, pinnate or bipinnate with up to thirty lobes, the end lobes mostly linear, 7–42 mm (0.28–1.65 in) long and 1–4 mm (0.039–0.157 in) wide. The flowers are arranged along an erect rachis 20–50 mm (0.79–1.97 in) long, and are red, sometimes orange or pale yellow, the pistil 19.5–25 mm (0.768–0.984 in) long, usually with a pink to red style. Flowering mainly occurs from February to March and the fruit is a follicle 11–16 mm (0.43–0.63 in) long.

== Taxonomy ==
Dissected holly-leaf grevillea was first formally described in 1868 by Ferdinand von Mueller, as Grevillea ilicifolia var. angustiloba in his Fragmenta Phytographiae Australiae.

In 2004, Trisha L. Downing, Marco Duretto and Pauline Ladiges raised the variety to species status as G. angustiloba and described two subspecies in Australian Systematic Botany. These subspecies are accepted by the Australian Plant Census:

- G. angustiloba (F.Muell.) Downing subsp. angustiloba has leaf lobes 2–4 mm (0.079–0.157 in) wide;
- G. angustiloba subsp. wirregaensis Downing has leaf lobes mostly 1.0–1.5 mm (0.039–0.059 in) wide.

== Distribution and habitat ==
Grevillea angustiloba grows in mallee scrub, heath, and Melaleuca uncinata communities, mainly in the Little Desert region of western Victoria and in south-eastern South Australia.

== Conservation status ==
Grevillea angustiloba is listed as critically endangered on the IUCN Red List of Threatened Species. It has a severely restricted distribution, a small population exceeding no more than 250 mature individuals, and a projected population reduction of greater than 25% within the next generational length of 30–50 years. The main threats to this species include land clearing for agriculture, salinization and droughts.
