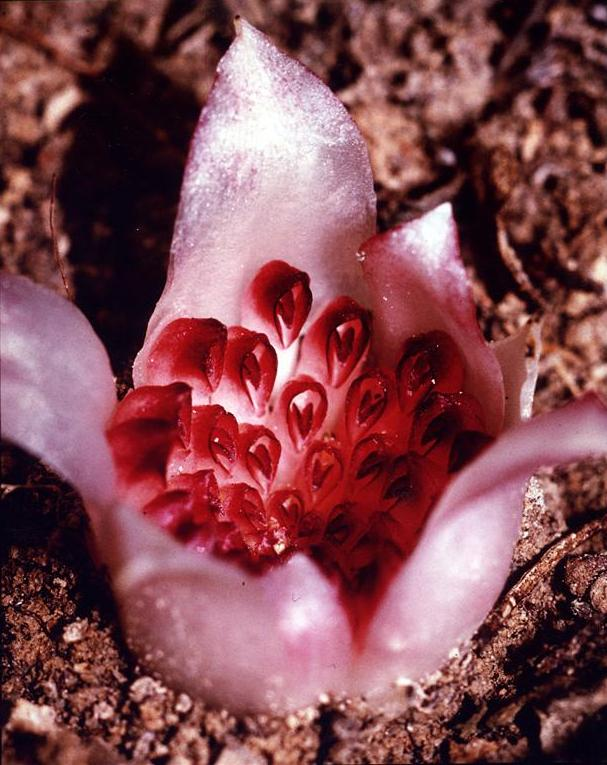
- Rhizanthella gardneri

Scientific classification
- Kingdom: Plantae
- Clade: Tracheophytes
- Clade: Angiosperms
- Clade: Monocots
- Order: Asparagales
- Family: Orchidaceae
- Subfamily: Orchidoideae
- Tribe: Diurideae
- Subtribe: Rhizanthellinae; R.S.Rogers
- Genus: Rhizanthella; R.S.Rogers

Type species
- Rhizanthella gardneri R.S.Rogers (1928)

Synonyms
- Cryptanthemis Rupp

= Rhizanthella =

Underground orchids

Genus of flowering plants

Rhizanthella, commonly known as underground orchids, is a genus of flowering plants in the orchid family, Orchidaceae and is endemic to Australia. All are leafless, living underground in symbiosis with mycorrhizal fungi. The inflorescence is a head of flowers held at, or just above the ground but mostly covered by soil or leaf litter and little is known about the mechanism of pollination.

== Description ==
Orchids in the genus Rhizanthella are mostly underground, perennial, sympodial, mycotrophic herbs with fleshy underground stems which produce new shoots at nodes where there are colourless leaf-like cataphylls. There are no roots and new tubers form at the end of short stems. The leaves are reduced to scale-like structures lacking chlorophyll, pressed against and sheathing the stems.

The inflorescence is a head containing many flowers and is held at, or just above ground level but the head is usually covered with leaf litter or soil. The head is surrounded by a large number of overlapping bracts and each flower has an erect, elongated bract at its base. The flowers are non-resupinate, arranged in a spiral, inward-facing, dull coloured and lack a stalk. The sepals and petals form a short, curved hood over the labellum and column, open on one side. The lateral sepals are joined to each other and to the dorsal sepal at their bases. The petals are joined at their bases to the column and are shorter than the sepals. The labellum is different in size, shape and colouration from the other petals and sepals, is thick, fleshy and has no nectar. The column is short with short wings. Flowering time depends on species and is followed by the fruit which is a berry that does not split open (indehiscent) and which contains 50 to 250 minute seeds.

Underground orchids do not possess chloroplasts but they retain plastid genes, although R. gardneri possesses one of the smallest organelle genome yet described in land plants.

== Taxonomy and naming ==
The first formal description of an underground orchid was by Richard Sanders Rogers who published his description of R. gardneri in the Journal of the Royal Society of Western Australia in 1928. The name "Rhizanthella" is a diminutive of Rhizanthes, a parasitic plant in the Family Rafflesiaceae. The name "Rhizanthes" is derived from the Ancient Greek words rhiza meaning "root" and anthos meaning "flower".

=== Species list ===
Five species are recognised by the Plants of the World Online:

- Rhizanthella gardneri R.S.Rogers – western underground orchid (W.A.)
- Rhizanthella johnstonii K.W.Dixon & Christenh. – south coast underground orchid (W.A.)
- Rhizanthella omissa D.L.Jones & M.A.Clem. (Qld.)
- Rhizanthella slateri (Rupp) M.A.Clem. & P.J.Cribb – eastern Australian underground orchid (N.S.W.)
- Rhizanthella speciosa M.A.Clem. & D.L.Jones (N.S.W.)

== Distribution and habitat ==
Rhizanthella gardneri occurs in the south-west of Western Australia where it grows in association with broombush (Melaleuca uncinata). R. johnstonii, also from WA, was split from R. gardneri in 2018. Rhizanthella omissa has only been collected once, at an elevation of 1,200 m (4,000 ft) in the Lamington National Park in Queensland. Rhizanthella slateri, formerly known as Cryptanthemis slateri, occurs in the Blue Mountains and similar ranges in New South Wales where it grows in sclerophyll forest. R. speciosa was discovered in 2016 in wet sclerophyll forest in Barrington Tops, which contrasts with the more-open dry forest habitat of R. slateri.

== Ecology ==
The pollination mechanism of Rhizanthella is not known. A single specimen of a small fly from the genus Megaselia, some small wasps and termites are the only observations of insects carrying pollinia of Rhizanthella.
