= Scaevola densifolia =

Scientific classification
- Kingdom: Plantae
- Clade: Tracheophytes
- Clade: Angiosperms
- Clade: Eudicots
- Clade: Asterids
- Order: Asterales
- Family: Goodeniaceae
- Genus: Scaevola
- Species: S. densifolia

Binomial name
- Scaevola densifolia Carolin

Species of flowering plant

Scaevola densifolia is a species of flowering plant in the family Goodeniaceae. It is a small, spreading shrub with fan-shaped cream or white flowers and is endemic to Western Australia.

== Description ==
Scaevola densifolia is a small, prostrate, understorey perennial herb or shrub with hairy stems up to 40 cm (16 in) long. The leaves are sessile, oblong shaped, wider at the apex, sometimes in clusters, margins entire or a tooth on either side, 8–30 mm (0.31–1.18 in) long and 2–9 mm (0.079–0.354 in) wide. The flowers are borne in racemes at the end of branches, bracts leaf like. The corolla cream or white, 12–15 mm (0.47–0.59 in) long with thick more or less flattened hairs on the outside, bearded on the inside and the wings up to 0.8 mm (0.031 in) wide. Flowering occurs mostly from October to December and the fruit is cylinder shaped, 3–4 mm (0.12–0.16 in) long and covered with soft hairs.

== Taxonomy and naming ==
Scaevola densifolia was first formally described in 1990 by Roger Charles Carolin and the description was published in Telopea. The specific epithet (densifolia) means "thick" and "crowded" referring to the leaves.

== Distribution and habitat ==
This scaevola grows in heath between the Oldfield and Fitzgerald Rivers in Western Australia.
