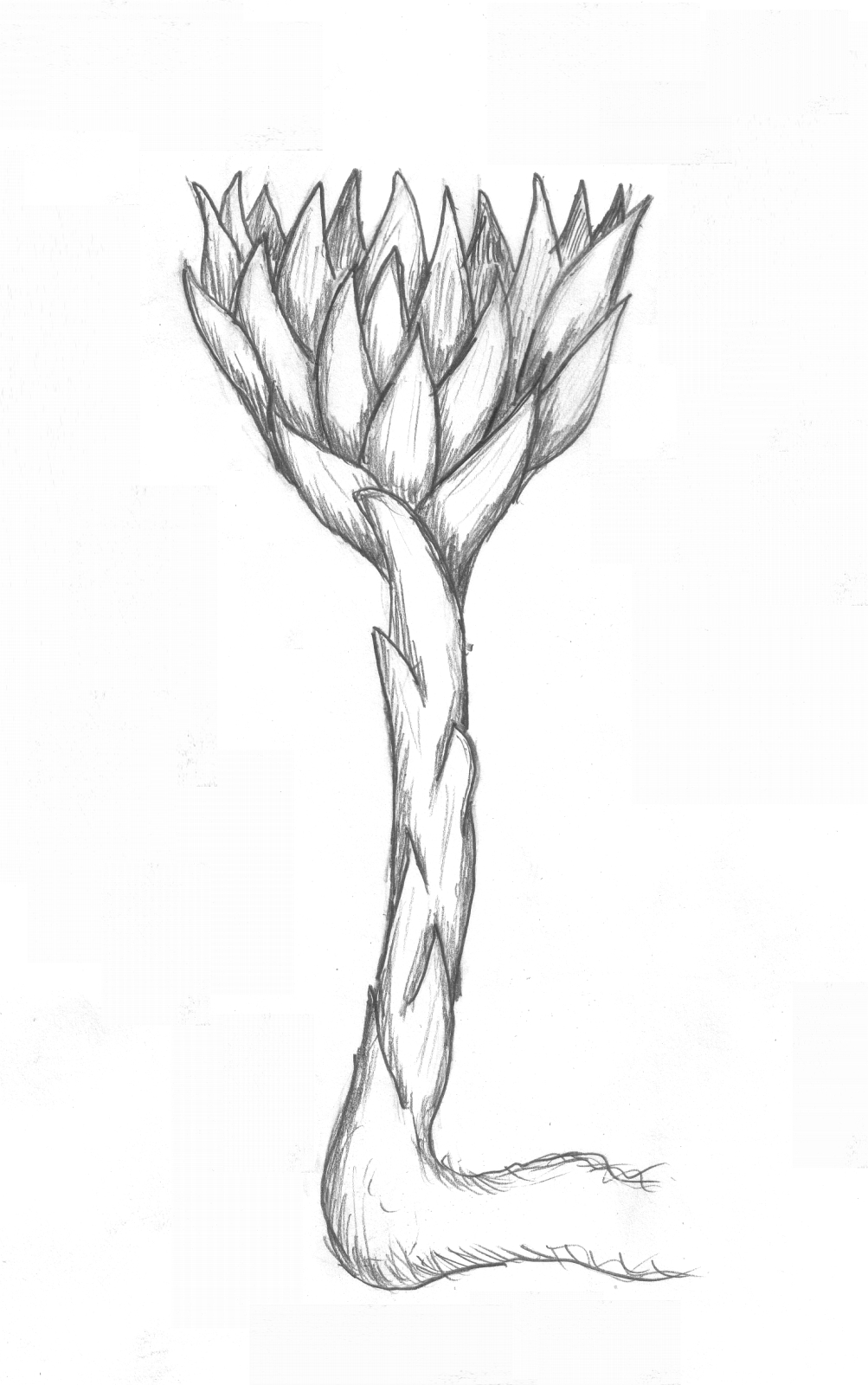

Conservation status
- Endangered (EPBC Act)

Scientific classification
- Kingdom: Plantae
- Clade: Tracheophytes
- Clade: Angiosperms
- Clade: Monocots
- Order: Asparagales
- Family: Orchidaceae
- Subfamily: Orchidoideae
- Tribe: Diurideae
- Genus: Rhizanthella
- Species: R. slateri

Binomial name
- Rhizanthella slateri (Rupp) M.A.Clem. & P.J.Cribb

Synonyms
- Cryptanthemis slateri Rupp

= Rhizanthella slateri =

Eastern underground orchid

Species of orchid

Rhizanthella slateri, commonly known as the eastern underground orchid, is a species of flowering plant in the orchid family and is endemic to New South Wales. It is a mycoheterotrophic herb that spends most of its life under the soil surface, its flowers only sometimes appearing a few millimetres about ground level.

== Description ==
Rhizanthella slateri is a leafless, sympodial herb with a branching, whitish, underground stem up to 150 mm (5.9 in) long and about 15 mm (0.59 in) in diameter with prominent overlapping bracts. The stem is often branched with up to four flowering heads. The heads are up to 20 mm (0.79 in) in diameter and have up to thirty tube-shaped, purplish flowers surrounded by whitish, triangular floral bracts up to 8 mm (0.31 in) long. The dorsal sepal is curved with a thread-like tip and has a broad base that forms a hood over the column and the lateral sepals, sometimes protruding above the floral bracts. The petals are about half as long as the lateral sepals. The labellum is thick, tongue-like, heart-shaped and covered with fine, pimply papillae. The column is short and broad with narrow "wings". Flowering occurs in October and November with the heads maturing below the soil surface or up to 20 mm (0.79 in) above ground level.

== Taxonomy and naming ==
The eastern underground orchid was first formally described in 1932 by Herman Rupp and given the name Cryptanthemis slateri in Proceedings of the Linnean Society of New South Wales from specimens collected near Bulahdelah in 1931. In 1985, Mark Clements and Phillip Cribb changed the name to Rhizanthella slateri. The specific epithet (slateri) honours Ernest William Slater who discovered the species.

== Distribution and habitat ==
Rhizanthella slateri grows in forest, usually under a deep layer of organic litter. It is known from populations in the Buladelah area, the Watagan Mountains, Blue Mountains, Dharug National Park and near Nowra, each population only known from a few individuals. Records from the Lamington Plateau in Queensland are now recognised as R. omissa.

== Conservation status ==
This underground orchid is listed as "endangered" under the Australian Government Environment Protection and Biodiversity Conservation Act 1999 and as "vulnerable" under the New South Wales Government Biodiversity Conservation Act 2016. The Bulahdelah population in the Great Lakes Local Government Area is listed as "endangered". That population was threatened by the building of a new highway, but a small diversion saved some individuals and some were able to be relocated.
