= Munglinup River =

River in Western Australia

Coordinates: 33°47′07″S 120°50′14″E

Location
- Country: Australia

Physical characteristics
- Source
  - elevation: 185 metres (607 ft)
- Mouth
  - location: Oldfield Estuary
  - elevation: sea level
- Length: 41 kilometres (25 mi)
- Basin size: 32,300 hectares (79,815 acres)

The Munglinup River is an ephemeral river in the Goldfields–Esperance region of Western Australia.

The headwaters of the river rise near Cheadanup Nature Reserve. It flows in a southerly direction through cleared farmland, then crossing the South Coast Highway near the town of Munglinup before discharging into the Oldfield River, of which it is a tributary, approximately 8 kilometres (5 mi) from the coast. For most of the length of the river it is within a vegetated corridor; the surrounding land is mostly cleared for stock with only about 15% remnant vegetation remaining. The river only flows in the winter months and the water is naturally saline or brackish.

The only tributary to the river is Clayhole Creek.

The word Munglinup is Aboriginal in origin, and of unknown meaning. The name was first recorded by C.D. Price, a surveyor in 1875. The Dempster brothers first used the name for their sheep station in 1860.
