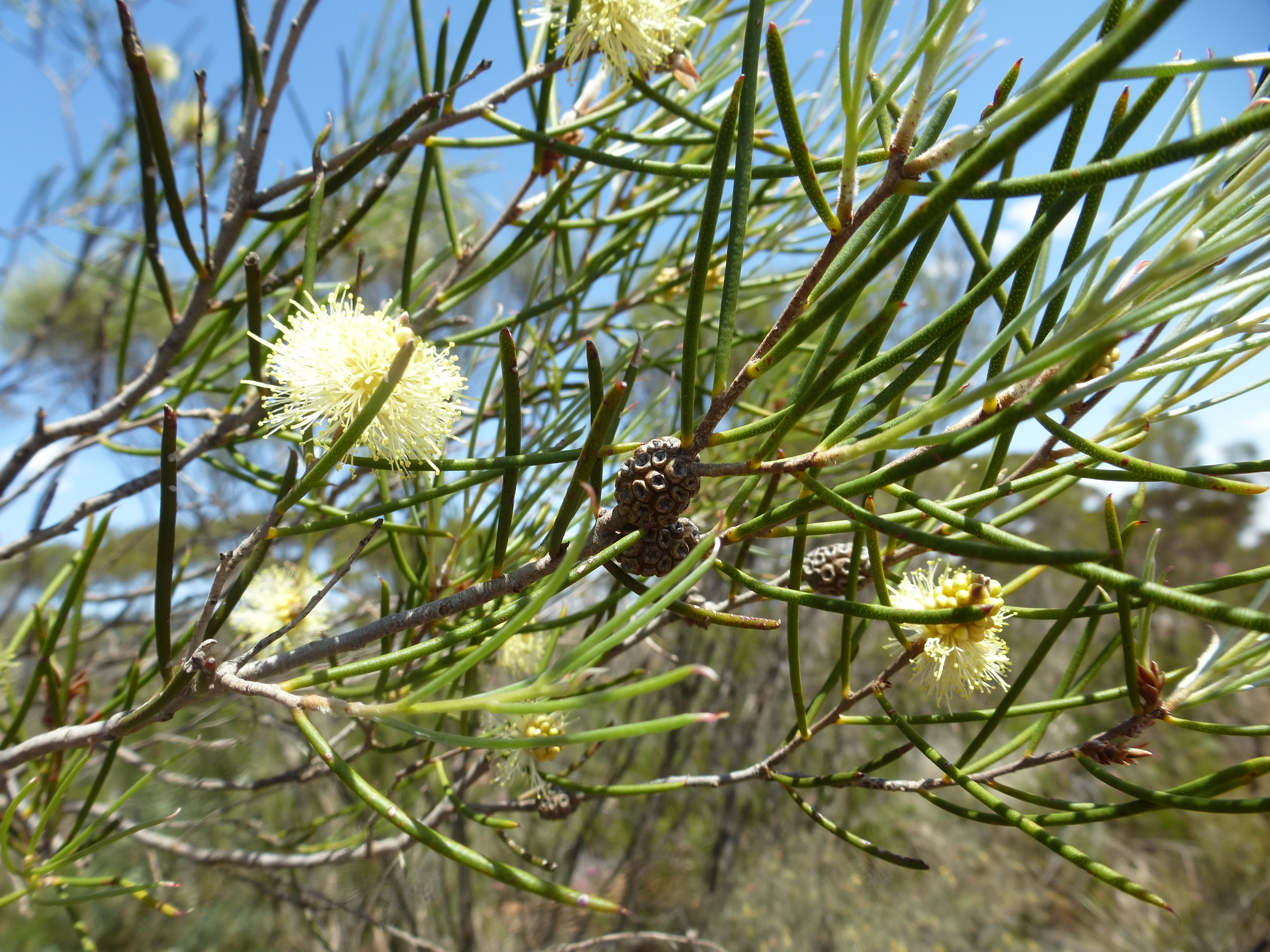

Scientific classification
- Kingdom: Plantae
- Clade: Embryophytes
- Clade: Tracheophytes
- Clade: Spermatophytes
- Clade: Angiosperms
- Clade: Eudicots
- Clade: Rosids
- Order: Myrtales
- Family: Myrtaceae
- Genus: Melaleuca
- Species: M. scalena

Binomial name
- Melaleuca scalena Craven & Lepschi

= Melaleuca scalena =

Species of flowering plant

Melaleuca scalena is a plant in the myrtle family, Myrtaceae and is endemic to the south west of Western Australia. Plants of this species were previously included in Melaleuca uncinata or broombush until a review of that species in 2004. Its leaves are narrow cylinders, the flowers in small yellow heads and the fruits tightly packed together in oval clusters. This species is very similar to Melaleuca hamata but the plants have a comparatively scruffy or less strong and healthy appearance.

== Description ==
Melaleuca scalena is a shrub growing to 3 m (10 ft) tall with peeling, papery bark. Its leaves are 19–85 mm (0.7–3 in) long, 0.8–1.5 mm (0.03–0.06 in) wide, roughly circular in cross section, with the end tapering to a point and often with a short bristle.

The flowers are pale yellow and arranged in heads containing 5 to 14 groups of flowers in threes. There are 5 sepals which are almost free from each other and five petals, each broadly egg-shaped, 0.9–1.3 mm (0.04–0.05 in) long and which fall off as the flower opens. There are five bundles of stamens around the flower, each with 3 to 9 stamens. Flowering occurs between October and December and is followed by fruit which are woody capsules packed closely together so that they appear as a single structure, 6–8 mm (0.2–0.3 in) long and slightly less in diameter.

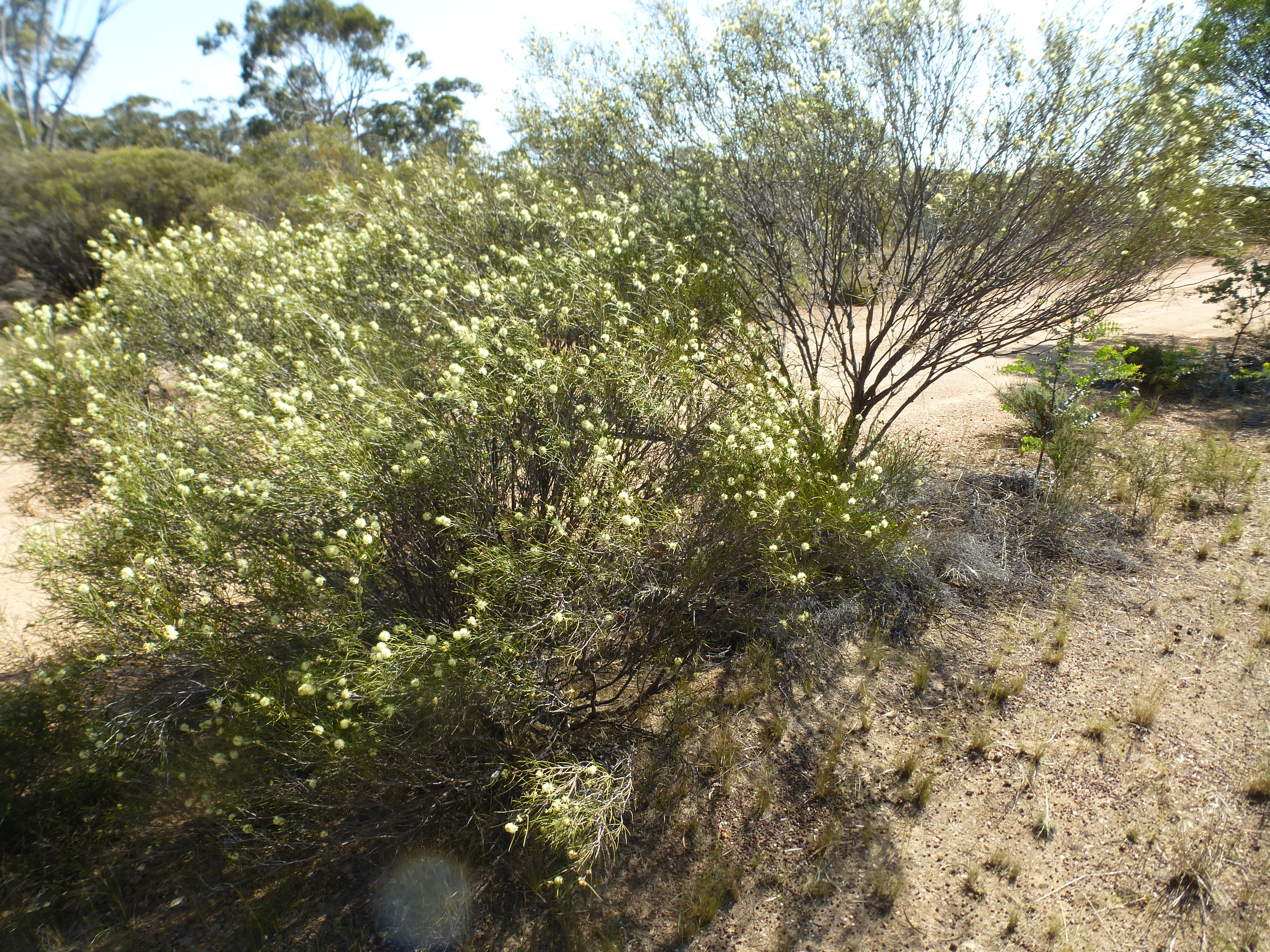
Habit near Babakin

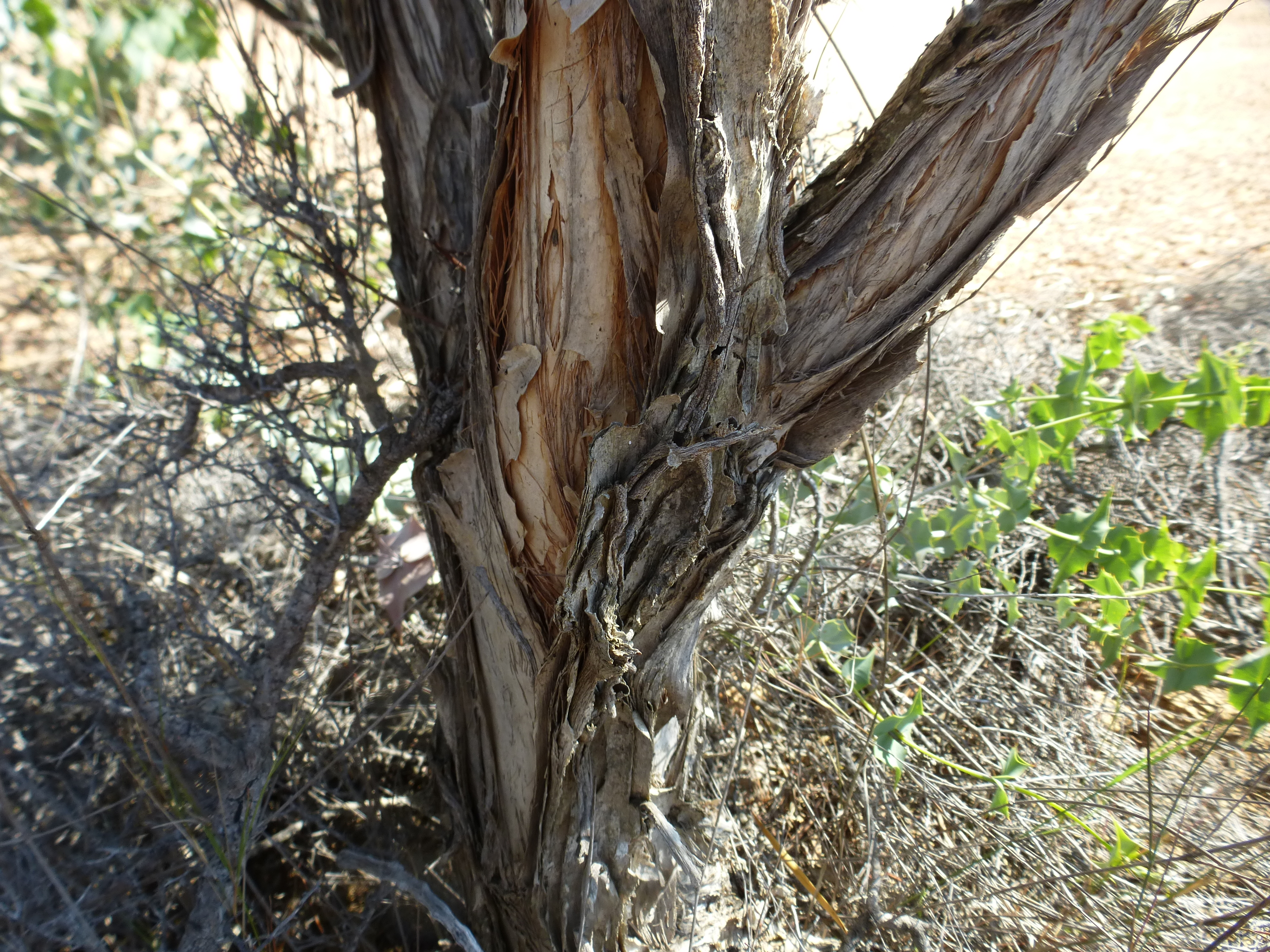
Bark

== Taxonomy and naming ==
Melaleuca scalena was first formally described in 2004 by Lyndley Craven and Brendan Lepschi in Australian Systematic Botany from a specimen collected 27 kilometres (20 mi) north-west of Babakin. The specific epithet (scalena) is from the Latin word meaning "unequal" referring to the impoverished appearance of this species compared to Melaleuca hamata.

== Distribution and habitat ==
This melaleuca occurs in and between the Wyalkatchem, Mount Walker, Woodanilling and Dumbleyung districts in the Avon Wheatbelt, Coolgardie, Esperance Plains, Jarrah Forest, Mallee and Yalgoo biogeographic regions. It grows in gravel, sand or loam on flats and drainage lines near salt lakes.

== Conservation ==
Melaleuca scalena is listed as not threatened by the Government of Western Australia Department of Parks and Wildlife.
