= Oldfield Estuary =

Estuary in Western Australia

Coordinates: 33°52′59″S 120°47′22″E

Oldfield Estuary is an estuary in the Goldfields-Esperance region of Western Australia.

The estuary has a length of 3 kilometres (2 mi) and is no wider than 600 metres (1,969 ft) with a total area of approximately 1 square kilometre (0 sq mi). The estuary has a main basin area of about 0.5 square kilometres (0 sq mi) and the rest is flood and tidal delta.

The Oldfield River and the Munglinup River both discharge into the estuary.

Uncleared bushland surrounds the estuary which has high dunes to the east and low sediments to the west. The lagoon is filled with river sediment to the north and beach sand to the south with a long high sandbar that breaks every three to four years.

The estuary functions primarily as a result of wave energy. The seagrass Ruppia megacarpa is found in the estuary.

The catchment area of the estuary is 30% natural vegetation and 70% cleared for cropping and pasture. The waters of the estuary are saline and heavily tannin-stained.
