= Rhizanthella omissa =

Conservation status
- Endangered (NCA)

Scientific classification
- Kingdom: Plantae
- Clade: Tracheophytes
- Clade: Angiosperms
- Clade: Monocots
- Order: Asparagales
- Family: Orchidaceae
- Subfamily: Orchidoideae
- Tribe: Diurideae
- Genus: Rhizanthella
- Species: R. omissa

Binomial name
- Rhizanthella omissa D.L.Jones & M.A.Clem.

Species of orchid

Rhizanthella omissa is a species of flowering plant in the orchid family and is found in the Lamington National Park in Queensland. It is a subterranean herb that grows in casuarina forest and flowers underground. It was first formally described in 2006 by David Jones and Mark Clements in the journal The Orchadian. The species is listed as "endangered" under the Queensland Government Nature Conservation Act 1992.
