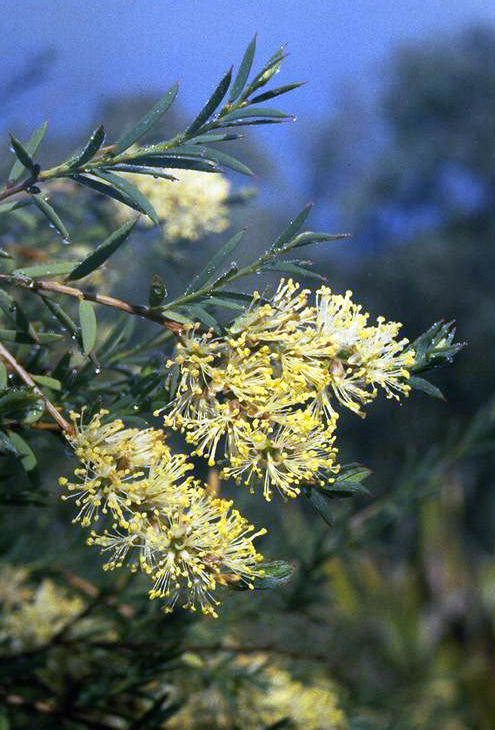

Scientific classification
- Kingdom: Plantae
- Clade: Tracheophytes
- Clade: Angiosperms
- Clade: Eudicots
- Clade: Rosids
- Order: Myrtales
- Family: Myrtaceae
- Genus: Melaleuca
- Species: M. leiocarpa

Binomial name
- Melaleuca leiocarpa F.Muell.

Synonyms
- Myrtoleucodendron leiocarpum (F.Muell.) Kuntze

= Melaleuca leiocarpa =

Pungent honey-myrtle

Species of plant

Melaleuca leiocarpa, commonly known as pungent honey-myrtle, is a plant in the myrtle family, Myrtaceae and is native to arid areas in parts of South Australia and Western Australia. It is an erect or branching shrub distinguished by its prickly foliage, yellowish flowers and, for a melaleuca, unusually large, smooth, roughly spherical fruits.

== Description ==
Melaleuca leiocarpa sometimes grows to a height of 5 m (20 ft) and has rough, furrowed, dark grey or grey-black bark. The leaves are spirally arranged, 6–21.8 mm (0.2–0.9 in) long and 1.5–5 mm (0.06–0.2 in) wide, narrow lance-shaped or linear with a very short stalk and tapering to a sharp point.

Flowers occur at or near the ends of the branches in clusters of up to 3 to 14 individual flowers, the clusters sometimes reaching 15 mm (0.6 in) in length and 28 mm (1 in) in diameter. The stamens are yellow-lemon in colour, in five bundles around the flower, each bundle containing 11 to 22 stamens. Flowers usually appear between August and December and are followed by fruit which are spherical, woody capsules, 7–9 mm (0.3–0.4 in) diameter.

== Taxonomy and naming ==
Melaleuca leiocarpa was first formally described in 1876 by Ferdinand von Mueller in Fragmenta phytographiae Australiae. The specific epithet (leiocarpa) is derived from the ancient Greek words λεῖος (leîos) meaning "smooth" and καρπός (karpós) meaning "fruit", referring to the smooth fruits.

== Distribution and habitat ==
Melaleuca leiocarpa occurs in the Gawler Ranges and northern Eyre Peninsula in South Australia. It is also found in arid areas of eastern Western Australia including the Avon Wheatbelt, Central Ranges, Coolgardie, Gascoyne, Geraldton Sandplains, Great Victoria Desert, Murchison, Pilbara and Yalgoo biogeographic regions. It grows in rocky lateritic soils and red sand on hillsides, outcrops and sandplains.

== Conservation status ==
Melaleuca leiocarpa is listed as not threatened by the Government of Western Australia Department of Parks and Wildlife.

== Uses ==
=== Horticulture ===
This melaleuca is rarely cultivated but is a showy shrub in full flower and is suited to most soils. It is hardy in well-drained conditions but requires full sun.

=== Essential oils ===
The oils from the leaves of this shrub are mostly monoterpenoids.
