= Oldfield River =

River in Western Australia

Coordinates: 33°51′26.39″S 120°46′59.21″E

Location
- Country: Australia

Physical characteristics
- Source
  - elevation: 329 metres (1,079 ft)
- Mouth
  - location: Oldfield Estuary
- Length: 95 km (59 mi)
- Basin size: 2,479 km^{2} (957 sq mi)
- Discharge
  - average: 6,900 ML/a (0.22 m^{3}/s; 7.7 cu ft/s)

The Oldfield River is an ephemeral river in the Goldfields-Esperance region of Western Australia that rises 95 kilometres (59 mi) inland from the South Coast at the edge of the Yilgarn plateau. The river starts at 300 metres (984 ft) above sea level then flows in a south easterly direction crossing the South Coast Highway near Munglinup.

The river gently undulates through sandstone forming gentle valleys with many granite outcrops, the river then carves deeper valleys through the siltstone before entering the coastal plain. The river is then joined by its tributary, the Munglinup River, before flowing into the Oldfield estuary which discharges into the Southern Ocean. The only other tributary of the Oldfield River is Coujinup Creek.

The river is regarded as saline with high nutrient levels, moderate sedimentation, moderate fringing vegetation and has a low flood risk.

== The European Naming of the Oldfield River ==
Named as Oldfield river by the settler Michael Simon Dempster in a letter written in 1866, the river is thought to have been named after Augustus Frederick Oldfield a plant collector who was active around the south coast of Western Australia. The river was most likely named by Albert Young Hassell of Jerramungup who explored the area in 1861.

There appears to be some conjecture regarding the European naming of the Oldfield River. One theory is the river was named by the settler Michael Simon Dempster, in a letter written in 1866, after Augustus Frederick Oldfield, a plant collector who was active around the south coast of Western Australia. Another is the river was most likely named by Albert Young Hassell of Jerramungup who explored the area in 1861. However, in early 2022, a staff member at the National Herbarium of Victoria (MEL) catalogued a specimen of Hibbertia racemosa (Endl.) Gilg., collected on the Oldfield River, with a hand written annotation by Ferdinand von Mueller stating "This river was named by me. F.M.", no doubt after his colleague Augustus Frederick Oldfield.

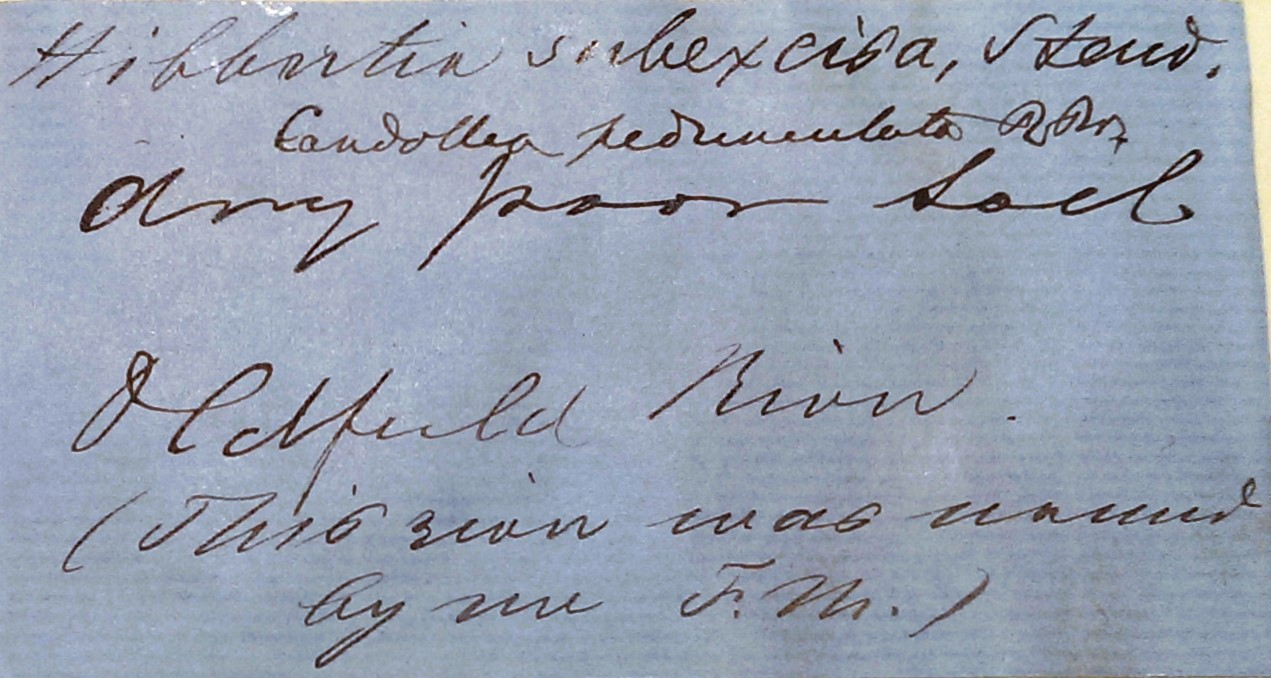
Label of a MEL specimen of Hibbertia racemosa, (Syn. Hibbertia subexcisa), collected at the Oldfield River which attributes the naming of the river to Ferdinand von Mueller.
