= Munglinup, Western Australia =

Munglinup
- Town
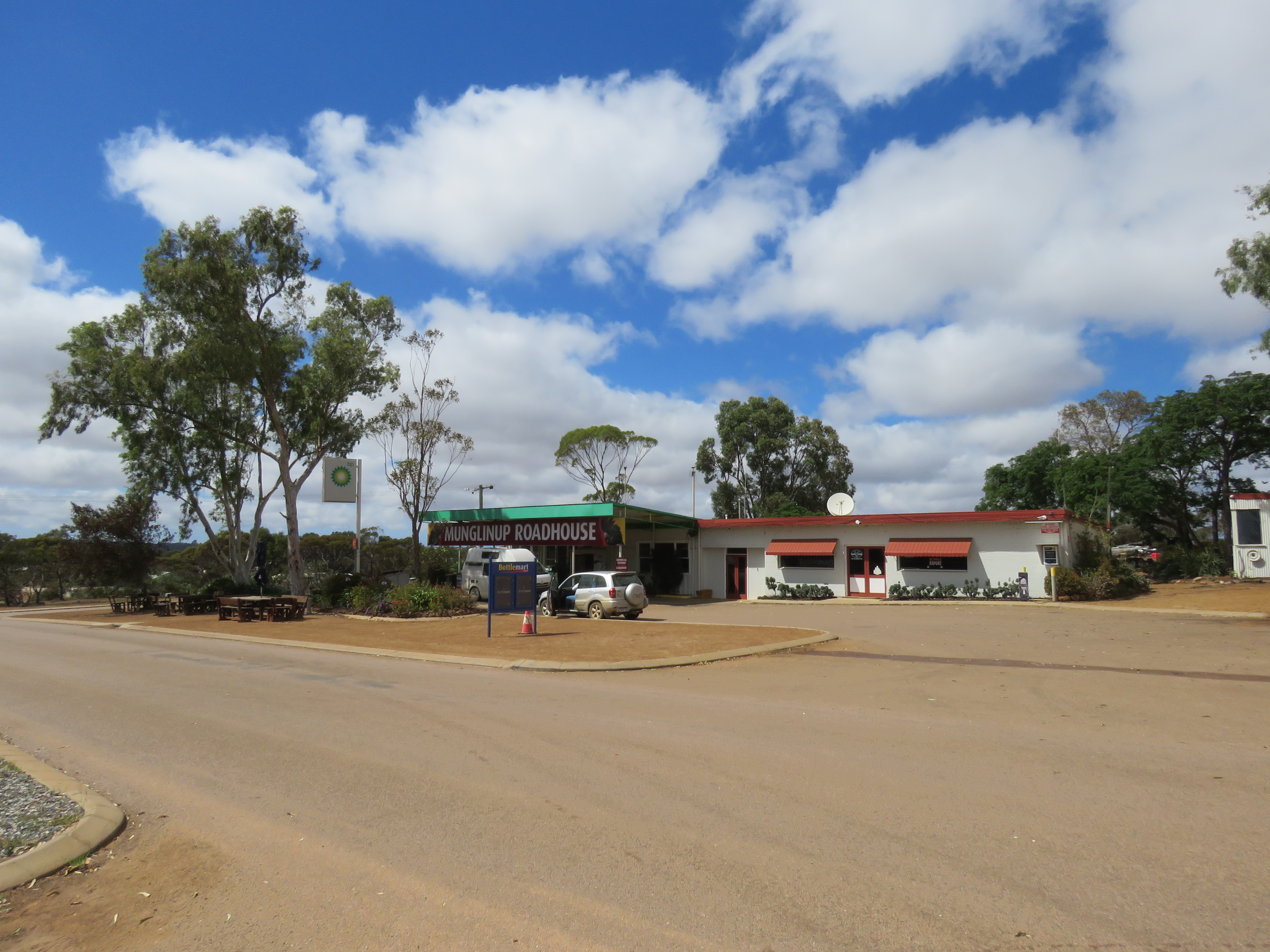
- The Munglinup Roadhouse in January 2024

- Interactive map of Munglinup
- Coordinates: 33°42′29″S 120°51′54″E
- Country: Australia
- State: Western Australia
- LGA: Shire of Ravensthorpe
- Location: 623 km (387 mi) SE of Perth; 73 km (45 mi) ENE of Hopetoun; 97 km (60 mi) WSW of Esperance
- Established: 1962

Government
  - State electorate: Roe
  - Federal division: O'Connor

Area
  - Total: 3,044.7 km^{2} (1,175.6 sq mi)
- Elevation: 220 m (720 ft)

Population
  - Total: 140 (SAL 2021)
- Postcode: 6450
- Gazetted: 1962
- Mean max temp: 23.3 °C (73.9 °F)
- Mean min temp: 10.6 °C (51.1 °F)
- Annual rainfall: 431.6 mm (16.99 in)
Localities around Munglinup
Hatter Hill	North Cascade	North Cascade
Ravensthorpe	Munglinup	East Munglinup
Jerdacuttup	Southern Ocean

Munglinup is a small town located in the Shire of Ravensthorpe in the Goldfields–Esperance region of Western Australia.

The town lies on the South Coast Highway between Ravensthorpe and Esperance and close to the Munglinup River. The river for most of its course defines the boundary of the Esperance and Ravensthorpe shires. At the Oldfield Estuary, the boundary goes to the eastern shore.

The word Munglinup is Noongar in origin and means where young people met their in-laws. The name first appears on maps made by the Dempster brothers, early settlers of the area in 1868.

The region was first opened up for farming in the late 1950s. By the early 1960s, the community asked for a townsite between Esperance and Ravensthorpe to be considered. The townsite was surveyed in 1961 and gazetted in 1962.

The surrounding areas produce wheat and other cereal crops. The town is a receival site for Cooperative Bulk Handling.

== Geography ==
=== Climate ===
Munglinup has a hot-summer mediterranean climate bordering on a warm-summer mediterranean climate and temperate semi-arid climate (Köppen: Csa/Csb/BSk) with very warm summers and mild winters. Extreme temperatures ranged from 47.6 °C (117.7 °F) on 6 January 2010 to 0.1 °C (32.2 °F) on 6 September 2019. The wettest recorded day was 5 January 2007 with 161.4 mm (6.35 in) of rainfall.

Climate data for Munglinup West (33.55°S 120.70°E) (220 m (720 ft) AMSL) (2002-2025)
Month	Jan	Feb	Mar	Apr	May	Jun	Jul	Aug	Sep	Oct	Nov	Dec	Year
Record high °C (°F)	47.6 (117.7)	46.4 (115.5)	43.7 (110.7)	36.5 (97.7)	32.0 (89.6)	27.5 (81.5)	25.8 (78.4)	31.1 (88.0)	34.9 (94.8)	39.0 (102.2)	43.1 (109.6)	45.2 (113.4)	47.6 (117.7)
Mean daily maximum °C (°F)	29.1 (84.4)	29.2 (84.6)	27.1 (80.8)	24.1 (75.4)	20.6 (69.1)	17.6 (63.7)	16.8 (62.2)	18.0 (64.4)	20.4 (68.7)	23.5 (74.3)	25.6 (78.1)	27.8 (82.0)	23.3 (74.0)
Mean daily minimum °C (°F)	14.4 (57.9)	15.0 (59.0)	14.0 (57.2)	12.1 (53.8)	9.6 (49.3)	7.8 (46.0)	6.7 (44.1)	6.8 (44.2)	7.5 (45.5)	9.3 (48.7)	11.1 (52.0)	12.6 (54.7)	10.6 (51.0)
Record low °C (°F)	7.8 (46.0)	7.1 (44.8)	6.2 (43.2)	2.6 (36.7)	3.0 (37.4)	2.1 (35.8)	1.3 (34.3)	1.8 (35.2)	0.1 (32.2)	2.6 (36.7)	3.6 (38.5)	5.0 (41.0)	0.1 (32.2)
Average precipitation mm (inches)	32.5 (1.28)	32.6 (1.28)	33.0 (1.30)	39.9 (1.57)	37.2 (1.46)	40.2 (1.58)	42.6 (1.68)	46.2 (1.82)	35.7 (1.41)	39.3 (1.55)	30.6 (1.20)	21.1 (0.83)	431.6 (16.99)
Average precipitation days (≥ 0.2 mm)	7.5	6.8	8.8	12.2	13.7	15.5	16.3	17.0	15.1	11.6	10.1	6.3	140.9
Source: Bureau of Meteorology (2002-2025)
