= Toompup, Western Australia =

Locality in the Shire of Gnowangerup, Western Australia

Toompup
- other
- Coordinates: 34.01273°S 118.42786°E
- Country: Australia
- State: Western Australia
- LGA(s): Shire of Gnowangerup
- Location: 330 km (210 mi) SE of Perth; 115 km (71 mi) NE of Albany; 35 km (22 mi) SE of Gnowangerup

Government
  - State electorate(s): Roe
  - Federal division(s): O'Connor

Area
  - Total: 264.5 km^{2} (102.1 sq mi)

Population
  - Total(s): 26 (SAL 2021)
- Postcode: 6336
Localities around Toompup
Mindarabin	Mindarabin	Mills Lake
Kebaringup	Toompup	Cowalellup
Magitup	Nalyerlup	Cowalellup

Toompup is a rural locality of the Shire of Gnowangerup in the Great Southern region of Western Australia. Toompup borders the townsite of Borden and Chester Pass Road in the west and the townsite of Ongerup in the north-east. The Toompup Nature Reserve is located within Toompup.

== History ==
Toompup is located on the traditional land of the Koreng people of the Noongar nation.

Toompup was once the final siding on the Tambellup to Ongerup railway line before its terminus at Ongerup, open from 1913 to 1957. The site of the former siding is now within the Toompup Nature Reserve. A second siding, Laurier, was further west and also within the boundary of the current locality.

The Toompup School site is on the shire's heritage register. A weatherboard building with an iron roof functioned as the local school from 1923 to 1934 as one of many bush schools within the shire.

== Nature reserve ==
The Toompup Nature Reserve was gazetted on 28 October 1966, has a size of 2.09 square kilometres (0.81 sq mi), and is located within the Mallee bioregion.
