= Magitup, Western Australia =

Locality in the Shire of Gnowangerup, Western Australia

Magitup
- other
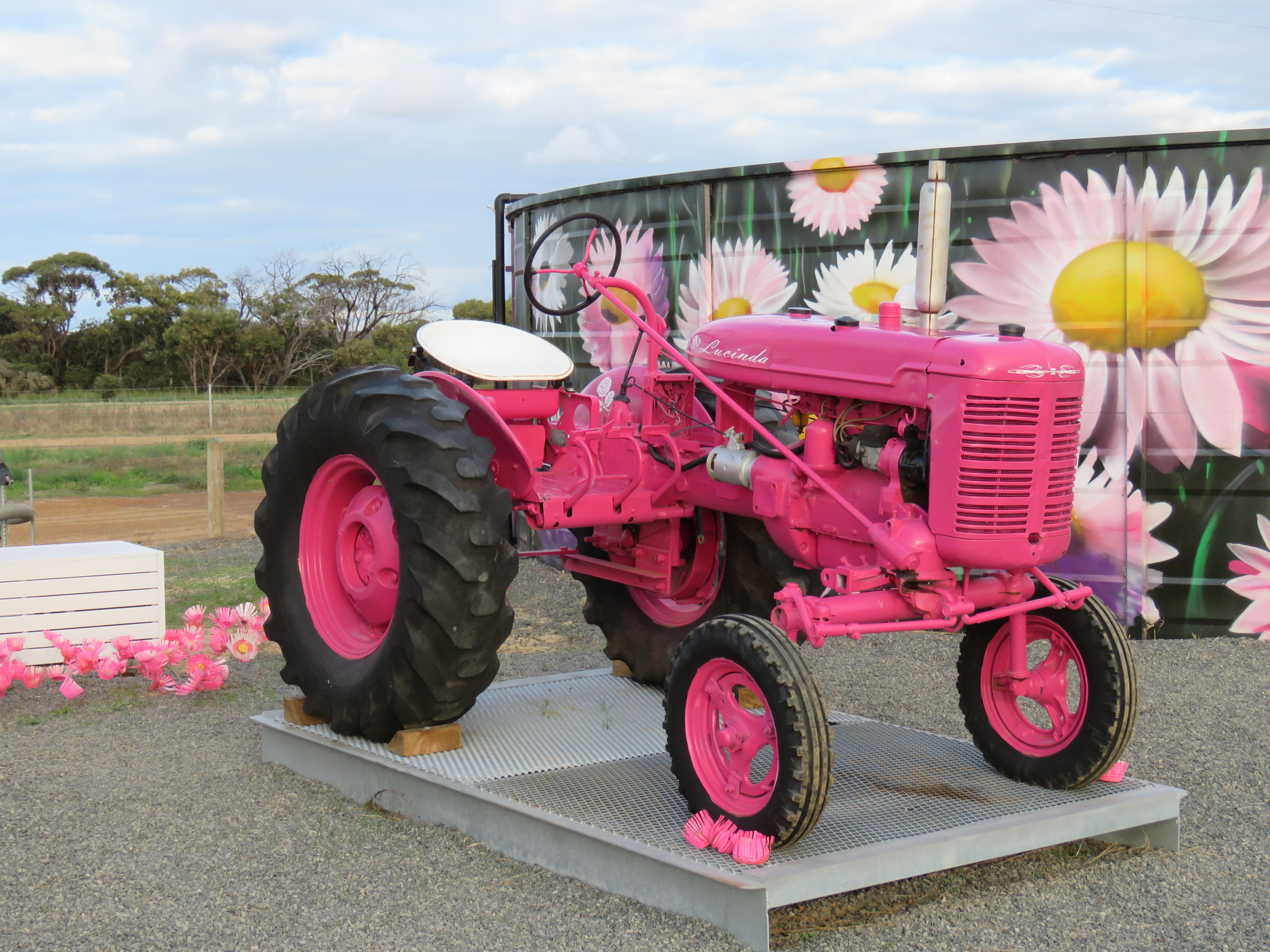
- "LUCINDA": Tribute to Rural women on Formby Road South, the local section of the Horsepower Highway

- Coordinates: 34.12157°S 118.20355°E
- Country: Australia
- State: Western Australia
- LGA(s): Shire of Gnowangerup
- Location: 323 km (201 mi) SE of Perth; 100 km (62 mi) N of Albany; 27 km (17 mi) SE of Gnowangerup

Government
  - State electorate(s): Roe
  - Federal division(s): O'Connor

Area
  - Total: 238.9 km^{2} (92.2 sq mi)

Population
  - Total(s): 20 (SAL 2021)
- Postcode: 6338
Localities around Magitup
| Pallinup | Kebaringup | Toompup |
| North Stirlings | Magitup | Nalyerlup |
| North Stirlings | Amelup | Amelup |

Magitup is a rural locality of the Shire of Gnowangerup in the Great Southern region of Western Australia. It borders the townsite of Borden in the north-east. The Pallinup River forms much of its northern border, while Chester Pass Road forms its eastern boundary.

== History ==
Magitup is located on the traditional land of the Koreng people of the Noongar nation.

The remnants of the Madgedup police outstation, dating back to 1860, are located in Magitup and are on the shire's heritage register. Police constable George Chester, after whom Chester Pass Road was named, was stationed at Madgedup. The station also operated a small store but was closed in 1868.

== Horsepower Highway ==
Formby Road South, which borders Magitup, is part of the Horsepower Highway, which originates in Broomehill and carries on to the neighbouring Shire of Gnowangerup. It is a 75-kilometre (47 mi) long tourist route. It displays vintage tractors and other artworks and finishes at the border of Stirling Range National Park.
