= Kebaringup, Western Australia =

Locality in the Shire of Gnowangerup, Western Australia

Kebaringup
- Town
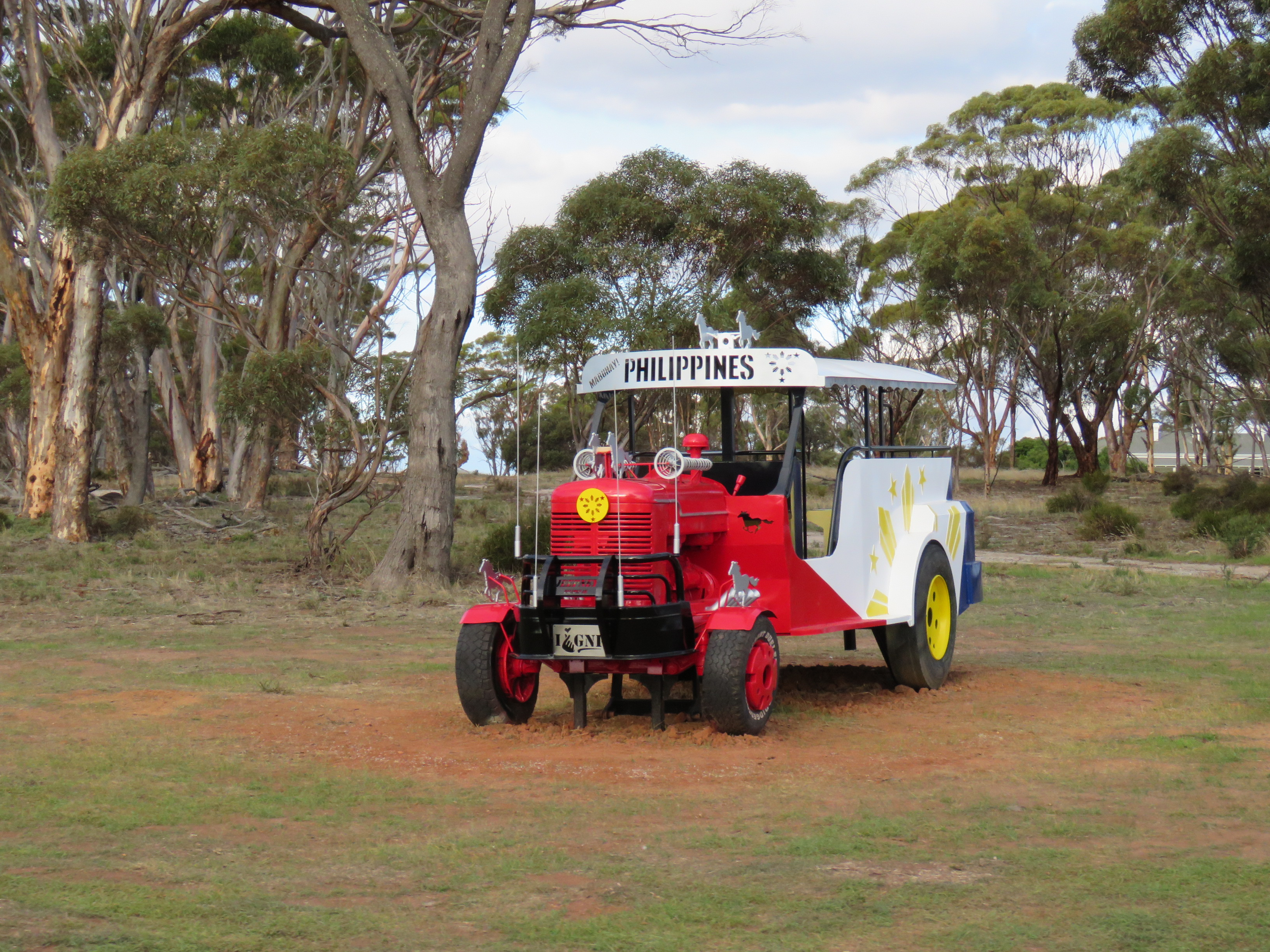
- DYIPNI: Da King of Da Road, a Jeepney and exhibit on the Horsepower Highway in Kebaringup

- Coordinates: 34.02457°S 118.14789°E
- Country: Australia
- State: Western Australia
- LGA(s): Shire of Gnowangerup
- Location: 313 km (194 mi) SE of Perth; 114 km (71 mi) NE of Albany; 16 km (9.9 mi) SE of Gnowangerup
- Established: 1918

Government
  - State electorate(s): Roe
  - Federal division(s): O'Connor

Area
  - Total: 195.3 km^{2} (75.4 sq mi)

Population
  - Total(s): 49 (SAL 2021)
- Postcode: 6335
Localities around Kebaringup
Pallinup	Jackitup	Mindarabin
Pallinup	Kebaringup	Toompup
Pallinup	Magitup	Borden

Kebaringup is a town and locality of the Shire of Gnowangerup in the Great Southern region of Western Australia. Kebaringup borders the townsite of Borden to the south-east, while the Pallinup River forms much of its southern border. The Chirelillup Nature Reserve is located within Kebaringup.

== History ==
Kebaringup and the Shire of Gnowangerup are located on the traditional land of the Koreng people of the Noongar nation.

Kebaringup was once a siding on the Tambellup to Ongerup railway line, open from 1913 to 1957. The site of the Kebaringup Siding is listed on the shire's heritage register. While nothing remains of the former siding, the outline of the former railway track remains.

A second siding, Formby, further west from Kebaringup, was also within the current boundaries of the locality. Like Kebaringup, the site of Formby siding is on the shire's heritage list. Two water tanks from the former installation are remaining at the site.

With the establishment of the railway siding, originally named Arnott, after a local settler, but soon renamed Kebaringup, a small block of land was set aside by the state government for a potential townsite. The townsite was gazetted in 1918, with the name, Kebaringup, dating back to 1887, when it was recorded by a surveyor. It is of indigenous origin but the meaning is unknown.

== Horsepower Highway ==
Formby Road South, which forms the locality's western border, is part of the Horsepower Highway, which originates in Broomehill and carries on to the neighbouring Shire of Gnowangerup, is a 75-kilometre (47 mi) long tourist route. It displays vintage tractors and other artworks and finishes at the border of Stirling Range National Park. One of the exhibits on the route is located in the north-west of Kebaringup, DYIPNI: Da King of Da Road, a Jeepney, the work of 14 local Filipino welders and fitters from the region.

== Nature reserve ==
The Chirelillup Nature Reserve was gazetted on 25 February 1910, has a size of 0.64 square kilometres (0.25 sq mi), and is located within the Mallee bioregion.
