= Nalyerlup, Western Australia =

Locality in the Shire of Gnowangerup, Western Australia

Nalyerlup
- other
- Coordinates: 34.15675°S 118.40012°E
- Country: Australia
- State: Western Australia
- LGA: Shire of Gnowangerup
- Location: 341 km (212 mi) SE of Perth; 109 km (68 mi) NE of Albany; 45 km (28 mi) SE of Gnowangerup

Government
  - State electorate: Roe
  - Federal division: O'Connor

Area
  - Total: 291.1 km^{2} (112.4 sq mi)

Population
  - Total: 34 (SAL 2021)
- Postcode: 6338
Localities around Nalyerlup
Magitup	Toompup	Cowalellup
Magitup	Nalyerlup	Cowalellup
Amelup	Amelup	Monjebup

Nalyerlup is a rural locality of the Shire of Gnowangerup in the Great Southern region of Western Australia. Chester Pass Road forms the western border of Nalyerlup.

== History ==
Nalyerlup is located on the traditional land of the Koreng people of the Noongar nation.

Located in the far north of the locality, Nightwell, which is on the shire's heritage register, is a long solid bed of granite outcrop in the Peenebup Creek. Nightwell was an important water source for the indigenous population of the area. It was dry during the day, but water would rush in through a hole in a cleft at night. The water source was spoilt by a surveyor in the 1920s when he attempted to enlarge the hole with explosives.

Near Nightwell, at the Nightwell Road crossing of the Peenebup Creek, there is a heritage listed grave of an Aboriginal infant, the daughter of Dave Coyne.
