= Mindarabin, Western Australia =

Locality in the Shire of Gnowangerup, Western Australia

Mindarabin
- Interactive map of Mindarabin
- Coordinates: 33.81321°S 118.35868°E
- Country: Australia
- State: Western Australia
- LGA: Shire of Gnowangerup
- Location: 319 km (198 mi) SE of Perth; 132 km (82 mi) NE of Albany; 33 km (21 mi) E of Gnowangerup

Government
  - State electorate: Roe
  - Federal division: O'Connor

Area
  - Total: 550.7 km^{2} (212.6 sq mi)

Population
  - Total: 49 (SAL 2021)
- Postcode: 6336
Localities around Mindarabin
Nyabing	Nyabing	Pingrup
Jackitup	Mindarabin	Mills Lake
Kebaringup	Toompup	Ongerup

Mindarabin is a rural locality of the Shire of Gnowangerup in the Great Southern region of Western Australia. Mindarabin borders the townsite of Ongerup in the south-east and is home to three unnamed nature reserves in the north. Chester Pass Road passes through the centre of the locality from south to north.

== History ==
Mindarabin is located on the traditional land of the Koreng people of the Noongar nation.

The West Ongerup School site, located in Mindarabin, is listed on the shire's heritage register, commemorates one of the many bush schools in the Shire of Gnowangerup. It was operational from 1940 to 1947, after which children from the area were bused to Ongerup for schooling. The Warperup Crossing School site, also in Mindarabin and on the heritage register, commemorates a school that operated there from 1935 to 1939.

Also heritage listed and in Mindarabin is the Wyoming homestead, dating back to 1895 and being the oldest homestead in the Ongerup area. It has been unoccupied since 1969.

== Nature reserves ==
The following unnamed nature reserves are located within Mindarabin. All are located within the Mallee bioregion:

- WA24770 Nature Reserve was gazetted on 9 July 1957 and has a size of 1.05 square kilometres (0.41 mi^{2}).
- WA26569 Nature Reserve was gazetted on 14 December 1962 and has a size of 1.28 square kilometres (0.49 mi^{2}).
- WA28549 Nature Reserve was gazetted on 12 May 1967 and has a size of 0.63 square kilometres (0.24 mi^{2}).
