= Monjebup, Western Australia =

Locality in the Shire of Gnowangerup, Western Australia

Monjebup
- other
- Coordinates: 34.25149°S 118.56199°E
- Country: Australia
- State: Western Australia
- LGA(s): Shire of Gnowangerup
- Location: 361 km (224 mi) SE of Perth; 102 km (63 mi) NE of Albany; 63 km (39 mi) SE of Gnowangerup

Government
  - State electorate(s): Roe
  - Federal division(s): O'Connor

Area
  - Total: 188.6 km^{2} (72.8 sq mi)

Population
  - Total(s): 21 (SAL 2021)
- Postcode: 6338
Localities around Monjebup
| Nalyerlup | Cowalellup | Needilup |
| Nalyerlup | Monjebup | Boxwood Hill |
| Amelup | Gnowellen | Boxwood Hill |

Monjebup is a rural locality of the Shire of Gnowangerup in the Great Southern region of Western Australia. The Pallinup River forms the southern border of Monjebup. The Greaves Road Nature Reserve is located in the south-west of Monjebup, while the Monjebup Reserve is located in the north.

== History ==
Monjebup is located on the traditional land of the Koreng people of the Noongar nation.

The Haxby School site, located in Monjebup, is listed on the shire's heritage register, commemorates one of the many bush schools in the Shire of Gnowangerup. It was operational from 1936 to 1943, when it closed because of a lack of teachers during the Second World War.

== Nature reserves ==
The Greaves Road Nature Reserve was gazetted on 5 September 1919, has a size of 2.51 square kilometres (0.97 sq mi), and is located within the Esperance Plains bioregion.

The Monjebup Reserve, a conservation area owned by Bush Heritage Australia, is split into two sections, Monjebup and Monjebup North, was established in 2007 and 2010 and has a size of 21.28 square kilometres (8.22 sq mi). It is adjacent to the Corackerup Nature Reserve.
