= Mills Lake, Western Australia =

Locality in the Shire of Gnowangerup, Western Australia

Mills Lake
- other
- Coordinates: 33.87105°S 118.56059°E
- Country: Australia
- State: Western Australia
- LGA(s): Shire of Gnowangerup
- Location: 332 km (206 mi) SE of Perth; 146 km (91 mi) NE of Albany; 56 km (35 mi) E of Gnowangerup

Government
  - State electorate(s): Roe
  - Federal division(s): O'Connor

Area
  - Total: 360.5 km^{2} (139.2 sq mi)

Population
  - Total(s): 39 (SAL 2021)
- Postcode: 6336
Localities around Mills Lake
Pingrup	Pingrup	Pingrup
Mindarabin	Mills Lake	Needilup
Ongerup	Cowalellup	Cowalellup

Mills Lake is a rural locality of the Shire of Gnowangerup in the Great Southern region of Western Australia. Mills Lake borders the townsite of Ongerup in the south-west. The No.2 Rabbit-proof fence once passed through the north-east of the locality.

== History ==
Mills Lake is located on the traditional land of the Koreng people of the Noongar nation.

Sections of the No.2 Rabbit-proof fence run along the north-east of Mills Lake, with the road following the former fence line still bearing the name Rabbit Proof Fence Road.

The Cassencarry homestead, located in Mills Lake, is listed on the shire's heritage register. The homestead dates back to 1912 at its current location but was originally built in Coolgardie. From there, it was dismantled and transported by rail to Broomehill, followed by wagon transport to the current Lake Cassencarry location.
