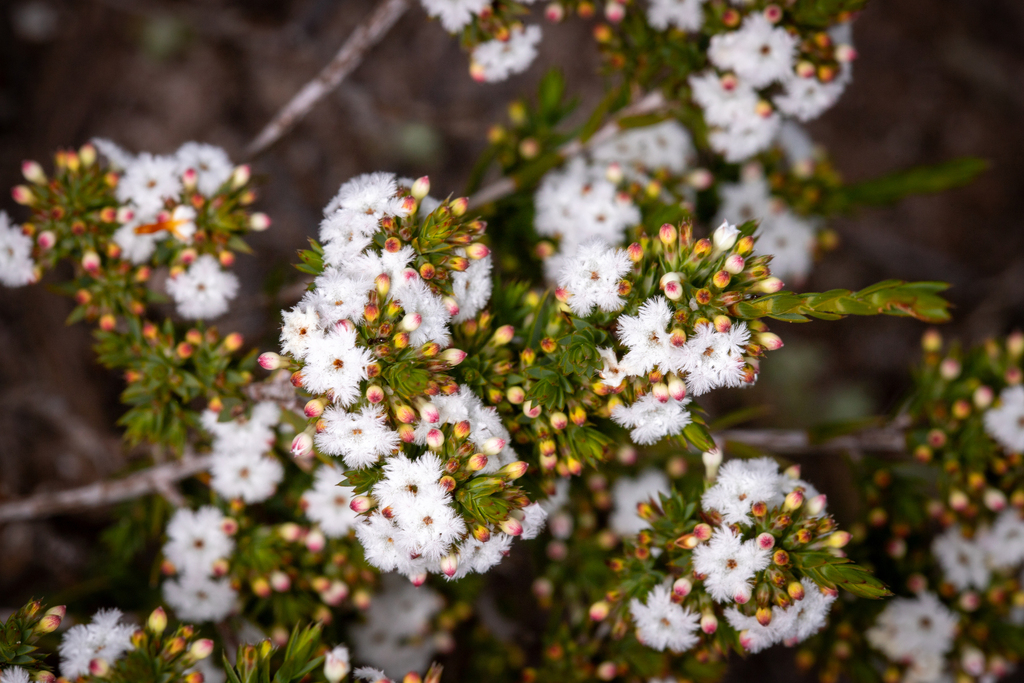
- In the Stirling Range National Park

Scientific classification
- Kingdom: Plantae
- Clade: Embryophytes
- Clade: Tracheophytes
- Clade: Spermatophytes
- Clade: Angiosperms
- Clade: Eudicots
- Clade: Asterids
- Order: Ericales
- Family: Ericaceae
- Genus: Styphelia
- Species: S. annulata

Binomial name
- Styphelia annulata Hislop

= Styphelia annulata =

Species of plant

Styphelia annulata is a species of flowering plant in the heath family Ericaceae and is endemic to the south-west of Western Australia. It is low, compact shrub with spirally arranged, sharply pointed, narrowly egg-shaped or egg-shaped leaves and white, tube-shaped flowers.

== Description ==
Styphelia annulata is a low, usually compact shrub that typically grows up to 40 cm (16 in) high and 60 cm (24 in) wide, occasionally up to 70 cm (28 in), its young branchlets usually hairy, sometimes glabrous. The leaves are spirally arranged, narrowly egg-shaped or egg-shaped, 1.4–6 mm (0.055–0.236 in) long and 0.5–1.5 mm (0.020–0.059 in) wide on a petiole 0.2–0.5 mm (0.0079–0.0197 in) long. The flowers are usually borne in erect groups 2.2–5.5 mm (0.087–0.217 in) long with two to five erect sessile flowers. The bracts are narrowly egg-shaped to egg-shaped, 1.2–3.2 mm (0.047–0.126 in) long, 0.7–1.0 mm (0.028–0.039 in) wide, the bracteoles similarly shaped, 1.4–3.2 mm (0.055–0.126 in) long and 0.6–1.0 mm (0.024–0.039 in) wide. The sepals are narrowly egg-shaped, 2.3–3.2 mm (0.091–0.126 in) long and the petals white, and form a tube 2.5–3.8 mm (0.098–0.150 in) long, the lobes white, often flushed with pink, 1.3–1.7 mm (0.051–0.067 in) long. The anthers are fully enclosed in the petal tube, 0.8–1.5 mm (0.031–0.059 in) long. Flowering mainly occurs from September to November and the fruit is spindle-shaped, usually curved, 3.2–4.2 mm (0.13–0.17 in) long and circular in cross section.

== Taxonomy ==
Styphelia annulata was first formally described in 2022 by Michael Hislop in the Nuytsia from specimens collected by Richard Cowan on Sounness Farm, near Stirling Range National Park in 1986. The specific epithet (annulata) means 'furnished with a ring', referring to the ring of hairs at the base of the ovary.

== Distribution and habitat ==
This styphelia is widely distributed in an area between Muchea, Bolgart and Dowerin in the north and from south-west of Mount Barker and Ongerup in the south, in the Avon Wheatbelt, Esperance Plains, Jarrah Forest, Mallee and Swan Coastal Plain bioregions of south-western Western Australia.

== Conservation status ==
Styphelia annulata is listed as 'not threatened' by the Government of Western Australia Department of Biodiversity, Conservation and Attractions.
