= Jackitup, Western Australia =

Locality in the Shire of Gnowangerup, Western Australia

Jackitup
- other
- Coordinates: 33.88889°S 118.09129°E
- Country: Australia
- State: Western Australia
- LGA: Shire of Gnowangerup
- Location: 300 km (190 mi) SE of Perth; 127 km (79 mi) NE of Albany; 9 km (5.6 mi) NE of Gnowangerup

Government
  - State electorate: Roe
  - Federal division: O'Connor

Area
  - Total: 433.7 km^{2} (167.5 sq mi)

Population
  - Total: 53 (SAL 2021)
- Postcode: 6335
Localities around Jackitup
Nyabing	Nyabing	Nyabing
Pallinup	Jackitup	Mindarabin
Gnowangerup	Kebaringup	Mindarabin

Jackitup is a rural locality of the Shire of Gnowangerup in the Great Southern region of Western Australia. It borders the townsite of Gnowangerup in the south-west of the locality, with the Gnowangerup golf course being in Jackitup.

== History ==
Jackitup is located on the traditional land of the Koreng people of the Noongar nation.

The Jackitup School site is on the shire's heritage register. Originally, the local community hall was used for schooling from 1913 onwards. A separate school was built next to the hall and opened in 1924, closing in 1947, when the pupils were send to Gnowangerup by bus. The school building was also relocated there.

Located near the school site is the also heritage listed Rockview homestead. Rockview, dating back to 1905, was the centre of the early Jackitup community.

Also heritage listed is the site of the former Gnowangerup Aboriginal Mission and Agricultural School, which was operated from 1935 as a school for Aboriginal boys by the Baptist Church.
