= List of State Register of Heritage Places in the Shire of Gnowangerup =

List of heritage sites in Western Australia

The State Register of Heritage Places is maintained by the Heritage Council of Western Australia. As of 2026, 115 places are heritage-listed in the Shire of Gnowangerup, of which two are on the State Register of Heritage Places.

== List ==
=== State Register of Heritage Places ===
The Western Australian State Register of Heritage Places, as of 2026, lists the following two state registered places within the Shire of Gnowangerup:

| Place name | Place # | Street number | Street name | Suburb or town | Co-ordinates | Notes & former names | Photo |
|---|---|---|---|---|---|---|---|
| Telyarup Homestead | 3417 | | Gnowangerup-Broomehill Road | Gnowangerup | 33.881079°S 117.923691°E | | |
| Gnowangerup Noongar Centre | 5072 | 7 | Aylmore Street | Gnowangerup | 33.939376°S 118.004992°E | Old Noongar Centre | |

=== Shire of Gnowangerup heritage-listed places ===
The following places are heritage listed in the Shire of Gnowangerup but are not State registered:

| Place name | Place # | Street number | Street name | Suburb or town | Notes & former names | Photo |
|---|---|---|---|---|---|---|
| Gnowangerup Police Station & Old Gaol (former) | 1089 | | Aylmore Street | Gnowangerup | Gnowangerup Craft House | |
| Gnowangerup Agricultural Hall (former) | 1090 | Corner | Aylmore & Whitehead Streets | Gnowangerup | Gnowangerup Masonic Hall | |
| Gnowangerup Hotel | 1091 | 7 | Allerdyce Street | Gnowangerup | | |
| Gnowangerup Methodist Church (former) | 1092 | Corner | McDonald & Aylmore Streets | Gnowangerup | Uniting Church | |
| Gnowangerup Shire Memorial Hall | 1094 | | Yougenup Road | Gnowangerup | | |
| Bank of Australasia (former) | 1095 | 38 | Yougenup Road | Gnowangerup | ANZ Bank | |
| Head's Hostel (former) | 1096 | 48 | Yougenup Road | Gnowangerup | Jenna House, Boarding House | |
| Gnowangerup District Hospital | 1097 | | Gnowangerup-Broomehill Road | Gnowangerup | | |
| Residence | 1098 | 2 | Yougenup Road | Gnowangerup | Gnowangerup Hospital, Second Hospital | |
| National Australia Bank | 1099 | 39 | Yougenup Road | Gnowangerup | | |
| Gnowangerup Star Newspaper Office | 1100 | 35 | Yougenup Road | Gnowangerup | | |
| Gnowangerup Post Office | 1101 | 55 | Yougenup Road | Gnowangerup | | |
| Bank of New South Wales (NSW) (former) | 1102 | | Yougenup Road | Gnowangerup | Shire Office | |
| St Margaret's Anglican Church, Gnowangerup | 1103 | | Yougenup Road | Gnowangerup | St Margaret's Anglican Church | |
| Borden Agricultural Hall | 1104 | | Magitup Road | Borden | | |
| Mongup Homestead | 1105 | | Mongup Road | Borden | Moir Homestead (former), Mungerup, Mongakup | |
| Ongerup Railway Barracks (former) | 1106 | | Eldridge Street | Ongerup | Ongerup Museum, part of the former Ongerup branch railway | |
| Ongerup Railway Goods Shed | 1107 | | Eldridge Street | Ongerup | part of the former Ongerup branch railway | |
| Salt River Hall | 1108 | | Chester Pass Road | South Borden | | |
| Brethren Church Hall | 2597 | | Davies Street | | | |
| Police Outstation (ruins) (former) | 4589 | | | Magitup, Via Borden | | |
| Pioneers' Houses | 4623 | | Yougenup Road | Gnowangerup | | |
| Rabbit Proof Fence No 2 and No 3 | 5022 | | | Northampton to Ravensthorpe | Emu Barrier Fence | |
| Nightwell | 5069 | | Nightwell Road | Borden | | |
| Mineral Springs, Aylmore Park | 5070 | | Kwobrup Road | Gnowangerup | | |
| Aboriginal Grave at Nightwell | 5071 | | Nightwell Crossing, Nightwell Road | Borden | | |
| JS Roe Plaque, Pioneer Park | 5073 | Corner | Park & Gnowangerup-Broomehill Roads | Gnowangerup | | |
| Lone Pine | 5074 | | Gnowangerup-Broomehill Road | Gnowangerup | | |
| House | 5075 | Corner | Aylmore & Denny Streets | Gnowangerup | | |
| James Bell's House | 5076 | Lot 35 | Yougenup Road | Gnowangerup | | |
| Invermay | 5077 | 72 | Yougenup Road | Gnowangerup | | |
| Gnowangerup Railway Station | 5078 | | Garnett Road | Gnowangerup | part of the former Ongerup branch railway | |
| Pallinup Siding - site | 5079 | | Pallinup Road | Gnowangerup | | |
| Formby Siding | 5080 | | Formby South Road | Gnowangerup | | |
| Kebaringup Siding - site | 5081 | | Gnowangerup/Ongerup Road | Kebaringup | | |
| Laurier Siding | 5082 | | Kyarup property | Gnowangerup | | |
| Toompup Siding | 5083 | | Toompup Road | Ongerup | | |
| Wayside Inn Site | 5084 | Corner | Pallinup & Beejenup Roads | Gnowangerup | Beejenup | |
| Gnowangerup Air Field | 5085 | Off | Strathaven Road | Gnowangerup | | |
| Borden Post Office | 5086 | | | Borden | | |
| Strathaven | 5087 | | Strathaven Road | Gnowangerup | | |
| Glenroy | 5088 | | Soldiers Road | Gnowangerup | Old Glenroy | |
| Glencoe | 5089 | | Soldiers Road | Gnowangerup | | |
| Clear Hills Homestead & Shearing Shed | 5090 | | Clear Hills Road | Gnowangerup | Condinup Spring | |
| Glengarry Homestead & Shearing Shed | 5091 | | Glengarry Road | Gnowangerup | Moordinup Pool | |
| Chirelillup | 5092 | | Formby Cnr | Gnowangerup | | |
| Privett | 5093 | | Gnowangerup-Broomehill Road | Gnowangerup | | |
| McCarthy's Humpy | 5094 | | Jackitup West Road | Gnowangerup | | |
| Pallinup River Stud Farm | 5095 | | Gillespie Road | Gnowangerup | Pallinup Estate | |
| Eugenup Homestead & Original Eugenup (Ruins) | 5096 | | Gnowangerup-Broomehill Road | Gnowangerup | | |
| Mianelup | 5097 | | Formby South Road | Gnowangerup | | |
| Rockview | 5098 | | Jackitup Road | Gnowangerup | | |
| Madgedup | 5099 | | Magitup Road | Borden | Magitup, Magidup | |
| Sandalwood | 6000 | | Sandalwood Road | Amelup | Pullingup Spring, Glenvale | |
| Moana Homestead & Woolshed | 6001 | | Chester Pass Road | Borden | | |
| Cassencarry | 6002 | | Ongerup Pingrup Road | Ongerup | | |
| Yate Creek | 6003 | | Gnowangerup–Ongerup Road | Ongerup | | |
| Wyoming | 6004 | | Gnowangerup–Ongerup Road | Ongerup | Warperup | |
| Bankwest–Ongerup branch | 6005 | | Eldridge Street | Ongerup | Eldridge's Boarding House | |
| Caldows Boarding House (former) | 6006 | | Yougenup Road | Gnowangerup | Montgomery's Store, G S Hendry & Co | |
| Gnowangerup Bakery | 6007 | | Yougenup Road | Gnowangerup | | |
| Frantom Butcher (former) | 6008 | | Yougenup Road | Gnowangerup | New Look Hair Salon | |
| Gnowangerup Newsagency | 6009 | | Yougenup Road | Gnowangerup | | |
| Lyric Tea Rooms (former) | 6010 | | Yougenup Road | Gnowangerup | Elders, G Crisp Hairdressing Salon, Bennett's Garage | |
| Chemist & Smith's General Store | 6011 | | Yougenup Road | Gnowangerup | Gnowangerup Homestitch | |
| Lee's General Store | 6012 | | Yougenup Road | Gnowangerup | Olde Shoe Shop | |
| Ongerup Public Hall & Ongerup Roll of Honour | 6013 | | Eldridge Street | Ongerup | | |
| Nigalup School Site | 6014 | | Pallinup Road | Gnowangerup | | |
| Gnowangerup District High School | 6015 | | Yougenup Road | Gnowangerup | | |
| Glenisla School Site, Glenisla property | 6016 | close to | Borden Road | Borden | | |
| Jackitup School Site | 6017 | Corner | Jackitup & Moores Dam Road | Gnowangerup | | |
| Willemmenup School Site | 6018 | Corner | Cambellup Tambellup Road | Gnowangerup | Wilgarrup School | |
| East Ongerup School Site | 6019 | | 3 km East of | Ongerup | | |
| South Kwobrup School Site | 6020 | | | Kwobrup | | |
| Kebaringup School Site | 6021 | | Gnowangerup Borden Road | Gnowangerup | | |
| Toompup School Site | 6022 | | Toompup Siding | Toompup | | |
| Salt River School Site | 6023 | | Chester Pass Road | South Borden | | |
| Borden Primary School | 6024 | | | Borden | | |
| Pallinup School Site | 6025 | | Martinup Road | Gnowangerup | | |
| Parkers School Site | 6026 | | 8 km East of | Ongerup | | |
| Wigboro School Site, Vaux's property | 6027 | | 19 km North of | Ongerup | | |
| South Borden School Site | 6028 | | Six Mile Road | South Borden | | |
| Gnowangerup Agricultural School | 6029 | 240 | Hinkley Road | Jackitup | Gnowangerup Aboriginal Mission | |
| Warperup Crossing School Site | 6030 | | Peerup Road | Ongerup | | |
| Haxby School Site | 6031 | | Borden-Bremer Bay Road | Borden | | |
| Ongerup Hall (School Site) | 6032 | | Eldridge Street | Ongerup | | |
| Moortvale School Site | 6033 | | Tie Line Road | Gnowangerup | | |
| West Ongerup School Site | 6034 | | Bridgeman Road | Ongerup | | |
| Old Gnowangerup Cemetery | 6035 | Off | Tambellup Road | Gnowangerup | | |
| Gnowangerup Cemetery | 6036 | | Strathaven Road | Gnowangerup | | |
| Gnowangerup First Hospital (former) | 6037 | Lot 89 | McDonald Street | Gnowangerup | House | |
| Aylmore Park Swimming Pool | 6038 | | Kwobrup Road | Gnowangerup | | |
| Gnowangerup Noongar Centre | 6039 | Corner | Corbett and Alymore Streets | Gnowangerup | | |
| Gnowangerup Scout Hall | 6040 | Corner | McDonald and Cecil Streets | Gnowangerup | | |
| Louis' Lookout | 6041 | | Gnowangerup Ongerup Road | Borden | | |
| Railway Crane (Agricultural School Marker) | 6042 | | Gnowangerup Ongerup Road | Gnowangerup | part of the former Ongerup branch railway | |
| Tractor Park, Gnowangerup | 6043 | Corner | Allardyce Street & Yougenup Road | Gnowangerup | Store Site, Gnowangerup & Districts Co-operative | |
| Gnowangerup CWA Hall | 6044 | | McDonald Street | Gnowangerup | | |
| Borden CWA Hall | 6045 | | Moir Street | Borden | | |
| Ongerup CWA Hall | 6046 | | Lamont Street | Ongerup | East Ongerup School Room | |
| Borden RSL Memorial Hall | 6047 | | Moir Street | Borden | | |
| Gnowangerup War Memorial | 6048 | Corner | Yougenup Road & Park Street | Gnowangerup | | |
| Ongerup & District War Memorial | 6049 | | Eldridge Street | Ongerup | | |
| The Lily | 6050 | | Chester Pass Road | Amelup | reproduction Dutch windmill | |
| Yardup Cottage | 6051 | | Chester Pass Road | South Borden | | |
| Parkers School Site, G Parker's property | 8779 | | 8 km East of | Ongerup | | |
| House | 8780 | Lot 2 | Yougenup Road | Gnowangerup | | |
| Pallinup River Railway Bridge | 14557 | | Tambellup-Gnowangerup Railway | Gnowangerup | part of the former Ongerup branch railway | |
| Ongerup Uniting Church | 15073 | | Eldridge Street | Ongerup | | |
| Ongerup Police Station | 17436 | | Vaux Street | Ongerup | | |
| Gnowangerup Police Station | 17437 | | Corbett Street | Gnowangerup | | |
| Eugenup Homestead | 25284 | Loc I675 | Gnowangerup Broomehill Road | Gnowangerup | | |
| Eugenup (Ruins) | 25286 | Loc I675 | Gnowangerup Broomehill Road | Gnowangerup | | |
