= Cowalellup, Western Australia =

Locality in the Shire of Gnowangerup, Western Australia

Cowalellup
- other
- Coordinates: 34.09226°S 118.55295°E
- Country: Australia
- State: Western Australia
- LGA(s): Shire of Gnowangerup
- Location: 345 km (214 mi) SE of Perth; 124 km (77 mi) NE of Albany; 54 km (34 mi) E of Gnowangerup

Government
  - State electorate(s): Roe
  - Federal division(s): O'Connor

Area
  - Total: 331.4 km^{2} (128.0 sq mi)

Population
  - Total(s): 19 (SAL 2021)
- Postcode: 6336
Localities around Cowalellup
Mills Lake	Mills Lake	Needilup
Toompup	Cowalellup	Needilup
Nalyerlup	Monjebup	Monjebup

Cowalellup is a rural locality of the Shire of Gnowangerup in the Great Southern region of Western Australia. The Gnowangerup-Jerramungup Road forms the northern border of Cowalellup, with the unnamed WA26792 Nature Reserve in the locality's north-eastern corner.

Cowalellup is located on the traditional land of the Koreng people of the Noongar nation.
