= Needilup, Western Australia =

Town in Western Australia

Needilup
- Town
- Interactive map of Needilup
- Coordinates: 33.9527°S 118.7716°E
- Country: Australia
- State: Western Australia
- LGA: Shire of Jerramungup
- Location: 440 km (270 mi) SE of Perth; 32 km (20 mi) E of Ongerup
- Established: 1954

Government
  - State electorate: Roe
  - Federal division: O'Connor

Area
  - Total: 845.2 km^{2} (326.3 sq mi)
- Elevation: 292 m (958 ft)

Population
  - Total: 99 (SAL 2021)
- Postcode: 6336
Localities around Needilup
Mills Lake	Pingrup	Jerramungup
Cowalellup	Needilup	Jerramungup
Monjebup	Boxwood Hill	Gairdner

Needilup is a town and locality in the Shire of Jerramungup, Great Southern region of Western Australia. Needilup is situated between Ongerup and Jerramungup along the Gnowangerup-Jerramungup Road. The Needilup and Corackerup Nature Reserves are located within Needilup, as is the Chereninup Creek Reserve.

== History ==
The establishment of a town arose after a local member petitioned the lands department for land to be made available for a townsite in 1951 after settlement in the area lead to a demand for land. Lots were surveyed soon afterward and the townsite was declared in 1954.

The name is Aboriginal in origin and the meaning is unknown. The name is taken from the nearby Needilup River that was first surveyed in 1901 and spelt in a variety of ways.

== Nature reserves ==
The Needilup Nature Reserve was gazetted on 14 August 1914, has a size of 6.22 square kilometres (2.40 mi^{2}), and is located within the Mallee bioregion. The Corackerup Nature Reserve was gazetted on 17 May 1963, has a size of 43.34 square kilometres (16.73 mi^{2}), and is located within the Esperance Plains bioregion.
