= Caladenia ultima =

Late spider orchid

Conservation status
- Priority Two — Poorly Known Taxa (DEC)

Scientific classification
- Kingdom: Plantae
- Clade: Embryophytes
- Clade: Tracheophytes
- Clade: Spermatophytes
- Clade: Angiosperms
- Clade: Monocots
- Order: Asparagales
- Family: Orchidaceae
- Subfamily: Orchidoideae
- Tribe: Diurideae
- Genus: Caladenia
- Species: C. ultima

Binomial name
- Caladenia ultima Hopper & A.P.Br.

Synonyms
- Calonemorchis ultima (Hopper & A.P.Br.) D.L.Jones & M.A.Clem.; Calonema ultimum (Hopper & A.P.Br.) D.L.Jones & M.A.Clem.; Jonesiopsis ultima (Hopper & A.P.Br.) D.L.Jones & M.A.Clem.

Species of orchid

Caladenia ultima, commonly known as the late spider orchid, is a species of orchid endemic to the south-west of Western Australia. It has a single erect, hairy leaf and up to three creamy-yellow flowers with a red-striped labellum. It is one of the last spiders orchids to flower each year.

== Description ==
Caladenia ultima is a terrestrial, perennial, deciduous, herb with an underground tuber and a single erect, hairy leaf, 60–150 mm long and 2–4 mm wide. Up to three creamy yellow or pale lemon-yellow flowers 80–110 mm long and 60–90 mm wide are borne on a stalk 150–250 mm tall. The sepals have long, brown, thread-like tips. The dorsal sepal is erect, 60–80 mm long and about 2 mm wide. The lateral sepals are 60–80 mm long, about 3 mm wide and turn stiffly downwards. The petals are 50–75 mm long, 2–3 mm wide and turn slightly upwards. The labellum is 12–15 mm long, 7–9 mm wide and creamy-white with red stripes and blotches with the tip curled downwards. The sides of the labellum are serrated and there are two rows of anvil-shaped, white or creamy-white calli along the mid-line. Flowering occurs from late October to early December, making it one of the last spider orchids to flower each year.

== Taxonomy and naming ==
Caladenia ultima was first formally described in 2001 by Stephen Hopper and Andrew Phillip Brown from a specimen collected in the Stirling Range and the description was published in Nuytsia. The specific epithet (ultima) is a Latin word meaning "farthest" or "last" referring to the late flowering of this orchid.

== Distribution and habitat ==
The late spider orchid is found in the Stirling Range National Park and Mount Barker area in the Esperance Plains and Jarrah Forest biogeographic regions where it grows in low-lying areas that are wet in winter.

== Conservation ==
Caladenia ultima is classified as "Priority Two" by the Western Australian Government Department of Parks and Wildlife, meaning that it is poorly known and known from only one or a few locations.
