= Acacia keigheryi =

Keighery’s Wattle

Conservation status
- Priority Three — Poorly Known Taxa (DEC)

Scientific classification
- Kingdom: Plantae
- Clade: Embryophytes
- Clade: Tracheophytes
- Clade: Spermatophytes
- Clade: Angiosperms
- Clade: Eudicots
- Clade: Rosids
- Order: Fabales
- Family: Fabaceae
- Subfamily: Caesalpinioideae
- Clade: Mimosoid clade
- Genus: Acacia
- Species: A. keigheryi

Binomial name
- Acacia keigheryi Maslin

Species of legume

Acacia keigheryi, also known as Keighery's wattle, is a species of flowering plant in the family Fabaceae and is endemic to a restricted area in the south-west of Western Australia. It is a diffuse or low-domed shrub with bundles of oblong phyllodes, spherical heads of yellow flowers and narrowly oblong pods appearing somewhat like a string of beads.

== Description ==
Acacia keigheryi is a diffuse or low-domed, rarely prostrate shrub that typically grows to a height of 30–50 cm (12–20 in) with branches sometimes dividing into wide-spreading, rigid, pointed branchlets. Its phyllodes are mostly oblong to narrowly oblong, 3–7 mm (0.12–0.28 in) long and 1–2 mm (0.039–0.079 in) wide, in bundles of mostly two to five with stipules 0.8–2 mm (0.031–0.079 in) long at the base. The midrib on the phyllodes is not prominent, and there is a gland 1–2 mm (0.039–0.079 in) above the pulvinus. The flowers are borne in spherical heads on slender peduncles 5–9 mm (0.20–0.35 in) long, each head 3–4 mm (0.12–0.16 in) in diameter with 20 to 28 flowers. Flowering occurs from mid-August to mid-October, and the pods are narrowly oblong, 10–25 mm (0.39–0.98 in) long and 3–4 mm (0.12–0.16 in) wide, straight to curved, pure brown and glabrous, sometimes appearing like a string of beads. The seeds are dark brown to blackish and mottled dull yellow with a dull cream-coloured aril.

== Taxonomy ==
Acacia keigheryi was first formally described in 2014 by Bruce Maslin in the journal Nuytsia, from specimens he collected south of Ongerup in 2013. The specific epithet (keigheryi) honours Gregory John Keighery, "in recognition of his significant contribution to the botany of Western Australia."

== Distribution and habitat ==
Keighery's wattle grows on gentle slopes in sand, loam or clay in very open mallee woodland over heath scrub in a restricted area west and north-west of the Stirling Range.

== Conservation status ==
Acacia keigheryi is listed as "Priority Three" by the Government of Western Australia Department of Parks and Wildlife, meaning that it is poorly known and known from only a few locations but is not under imminent threat.

== See also ==
- List of Acacia species
