= Daviesia scoparia =

Scientific classification
- Kingdom: Plantae
- Clade: Tracheophytes
- Clade: Angiosperms
- Clade: Eudicots
- Clade: Rosids
- Order: Fabales
- Family: Fabaceae
- Subfamily: Faboideae
- Genus: Daviesia
- Species: D. scoparia

Binomial name
- Daviesia scoparia Crisp

Species of legume

Daviesia scoparia is a species of flowering plant in the family Fabaceae and is endemic to the south-west of Western Australia. It is a broom-like, glabrous, leafless shrub with yellow, dark reddish-brown and maroon flowers.

== Description ==
Daviesia scoparia is a broom-like, glabrous, leafless shrub that typically grows to a height of up to 2 m (6 ft 7 in) and has erect spiny branchlets, its phyllodes all reduced to scales. The flowers are arranged in a group of up to three in leaf axils on a peduncle 0.5–2 mm (0.020–0.079 in) long, each flower on a pedicel 0.5–1 mm (0.020–0.039 in) long, the rachis 2–8 mm (0.079–0.315 in) long. The sepals are 3–4 mm (0.12–0.16 in) long and joined at the base, the upper two lobes joined for most of their length and the lower three triangular. The standard petal is elliptic with a notched centre, about 6 mm (0.24 in) long, 7–8 mm (0.28–0.31 in) wide, and yellow with a dark reddish-brown base. The wings are about 5.5 mm (0.22 in) long and maroon with yellow tips, the keel 4–5 mm (0.16–0.20 in) long and maroon. Flowering occurs in September and October and the fruit is a flattened, triangular pod 6–7 mm (0.24–0.28 in) long.

== Taxonomy ==
Daviesia scoparia was first formally described in 1995 by Michael Crisp in Australian Systematic Botany from specimens he collected near Borden in 1979. The specific epithet (scoparia) means "sweeper", referring to the broom-like habit of the plant.

== Distribution and habitat ==
This daviesia grows in mallee-heath or woodland mainly between Corrigin, Katanning and Condingup in the Avon Wheatbelt, Coolgardie, Esperance Plains, Jarrah Forest and Mallee biogeographic regions of south-western Western Australia.

== Conservation status ==
Daviesia scoparia is listed as "not threatened" by the Government of Western Australia Department of Biodiversity, Conservation and Attractions.
