= Kwobrup-Badgebup Important Bird Area =

Important Bird Area in Western Australia

Coordinates: 33°36′42″S 117°56′26″E

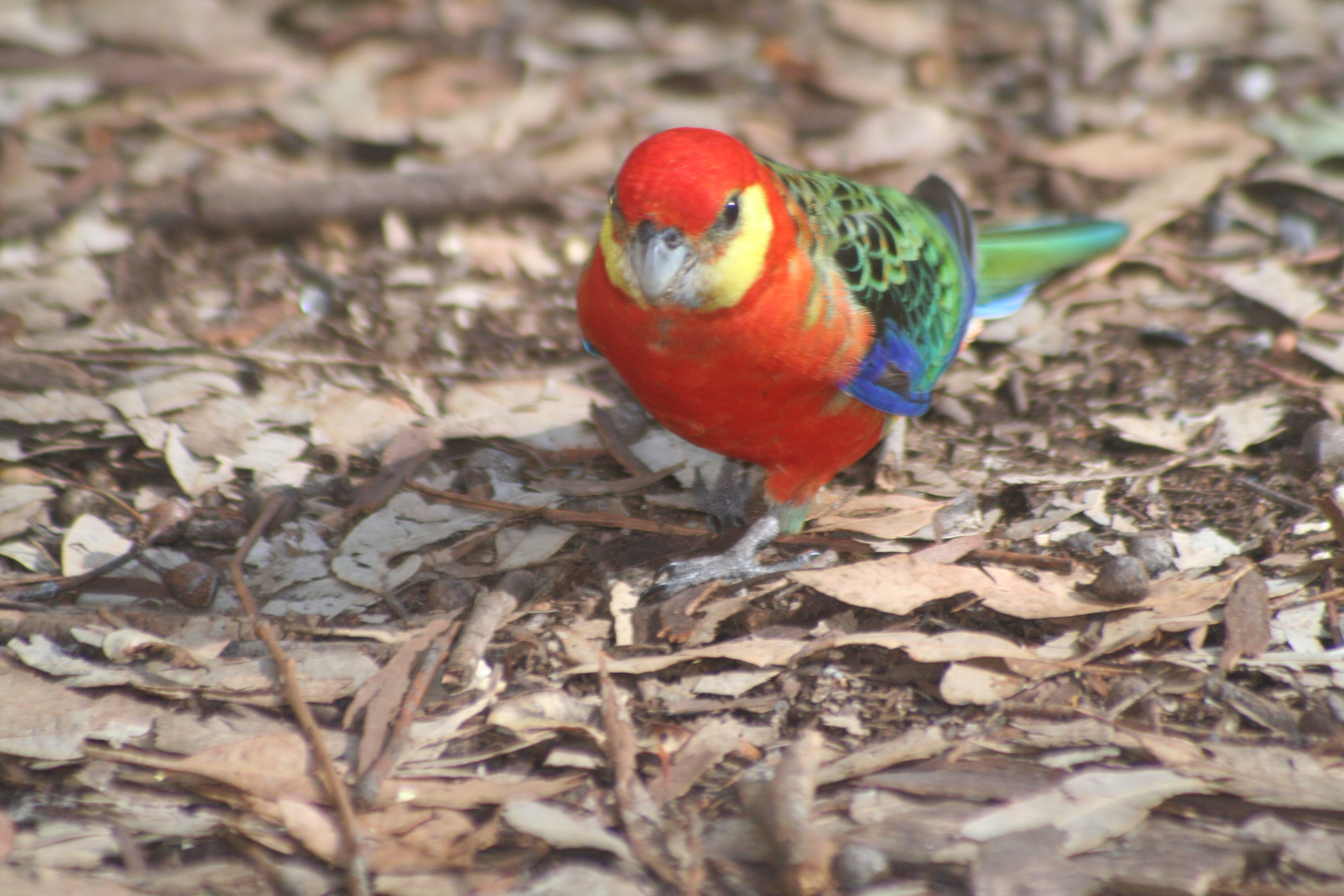
The IBA is an important site for western rosellas

The Kwobrup-Badgebup Important Bird Area comprises two separate reserves about 5 km apart, with a combined area of 602 ha, lying close to the two small towns of Kwobrup and Badgebup in the southern wheatbelt region of Western Australia.

== Birds ==
The site has been identified by BirdLife International as an Important Bird Area (IBA) because it supports up to 20 breeding pairs of the endangered Carnaby's cockatoo. The site boundaries are largely defined by areas of suitable nesting habitat with the vegetation consisting of remnant eucalypt woodland with some heathy shrubland. The site also supports populations of western rosellas, regent parrots, rufous treecreepers, blue-breasted fairywrens and western yellow robins.
