= Ongerup railway line =

Former railway line in Western Australia

Ongerup branch railway
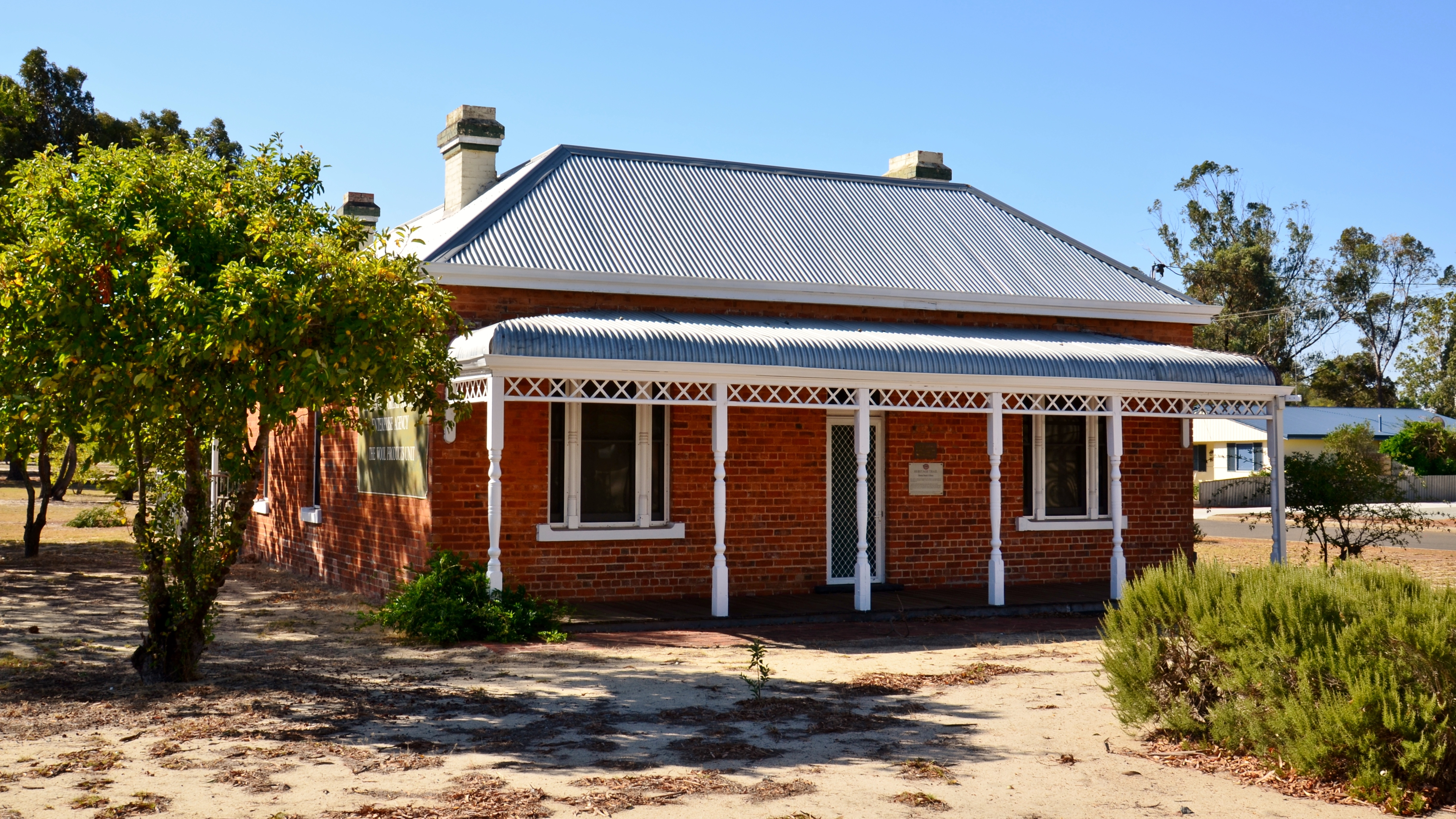
- The heritage listed Station Master's House in Tambellup

Overview
- Status: Closed
- Locale: Great Southern, Western Australia
- Termini: Tambellup; Ongerup

History
- Commenced: 1911
- Opened: 6 January 1913
- Closed: Gnowangerup -Ongerup: 1957 Tambellup-Gnowangerup : 2007

Technical
- Line length: 95 km (59 mi)
- Track gauge: 1,067 mm (3 ft 6 in)
- Ongerup Branch Railway Main locations

The Ongerup branch railway, also known as the Tambellup, Gnowangerup to Ongerup railway is a former railway line in the Great Southern region of Western Australia.

== History ==
The 94.1-kilometre (58.5 mi) Tambellup to Ongerup branch line from the Great Southern Railway main line between Perth and Albany was opened to Gnowangerup on 1 July 1912, and finally through to Ongerup on 6 January 1913. In 1928 there had been moves to request extension beyond Ongerup, however the proposal was not successful.

The line was developed to provide direct access for the expanding wheat production area to the port at Albany. The line was authorised for construction under the Tambellup–Ongerup Railway Act 1911. A timetable from 1937 shows two trains per week leaving Ongerup on Tuesdays at 06:55 and Fridays at 04:00. Lengthy connections of around 12 hours were available at Katanning for Perth, arriving approximately 30 hours after leaving Ongerup.

The line went via Tambellup, Dartnall, Toolbrunup, Pallinup, Gnowangerup, Formby, Kebaringup, Borden, Laurier, Toompup and Ongerup. Water supply for the trains was provided at Formby.

In 1918 a barracks was constructed on Eldridge Street for railway workers based in Ongerup. The building survived the closure of the railway and now houses the Ongerup and Needilup District Museum, opened in 1978.

In 1954, the state government of Western Australia had compiled a list of loss-making railway operations, of which the Tambellup to Ongerup line was one, having had a total expenditure of almost four times its earnings in the financial year to June 1953, £A 64,737 expenditure versus earnings of £A 17,731. The Katanning to Pingrup and Gnowangerup to Ongerup line closures in mid-1957 did result in a protest meeting in Katanning, where a number of state politicians were present to support the protest motion.

In 1986 the Gnowangerup Railway Station building was closed as a working station and remained unused until 2000, when it was dismantled and moved to the Lily Vineyard, near Borden, where it was rebuilt in 2003 as a restaurant.

The section of line from Gnowangerup to Ongerup was closed on 13 October 1957.

The Railways (Cue-Big Bell and other Railways) Discontinuance Act 1960, which officially closed the Gnowangerup to Ongerup line, was assented to on 12 December 1960. This act affected a number of Western Australian railways, officially closing multiple lines:

- Cue to Big Bell
- Malcolm to Laverton
- Wokarina to Yuna
- Geraldton to Ajana
- Brookton to Corrigin
- Mukinbudin to Bullfinch
- Southern Cross to Bullfinch
- Meekatharra to Wiluna
- Elleker to Nornalup
- Busselton to Flinders Bay
- Boddington to Narrogin
- Nyabing to Pingrup
- Gnowangerup to Ongerup

The Tambellup to Gnowangerup section was closed in July 2007, with the railway line shown as "not in use" by its operator, Arc Infrastructure.

Arc Infrastructure deems the railway line to be part of its Grain Freight Rail Network, which, in 2017, accounted for 50 percent of its network but only 10 percent of its freight. The line to Gnownagerup was classified as Tier 3.

In 2021, it was estimated that it would cost A$55.93 million to upgrade the Tambellup to Gnowangerup section of the railway line to reopen it.

== Named locations on line ==
- Tambellup (252 miles)
- Dartnall (257 miles)
- Toolbrunup (264 miles)
- Pallinup (269 miles)
- Gnowangerup (276 miles)
- Fornby (281 miles)
- Kebaringup (287 miles)
- Borden (295 miles)
- Laurier (300 miles)
- Toompup (306 miles)
- Ongerup (311 miles)

== Legacy ==
Within the Shire of Broomehill–Tambellup, the entire line from Tambellup to Gnowangerup is on the shire's heritage list. Additionally, the former Tambellup railway station and the station masters house as well as the railway sidings at Dartnall and Toolbrunup are on the list. The list also includes the sidings at Pootenup and Wansborough as well as the former Broomehill railway station, but these three are on the Great Southern Railway main line.

In the Shire of Gnowangerup, the Gnowangerup railway station and crane, the Ongerup railway barracks and good shed and the Pallinup River railway bridge are on the shire's heritage list.
