= Gnowangerup Mission =

Former mission in Western Australia

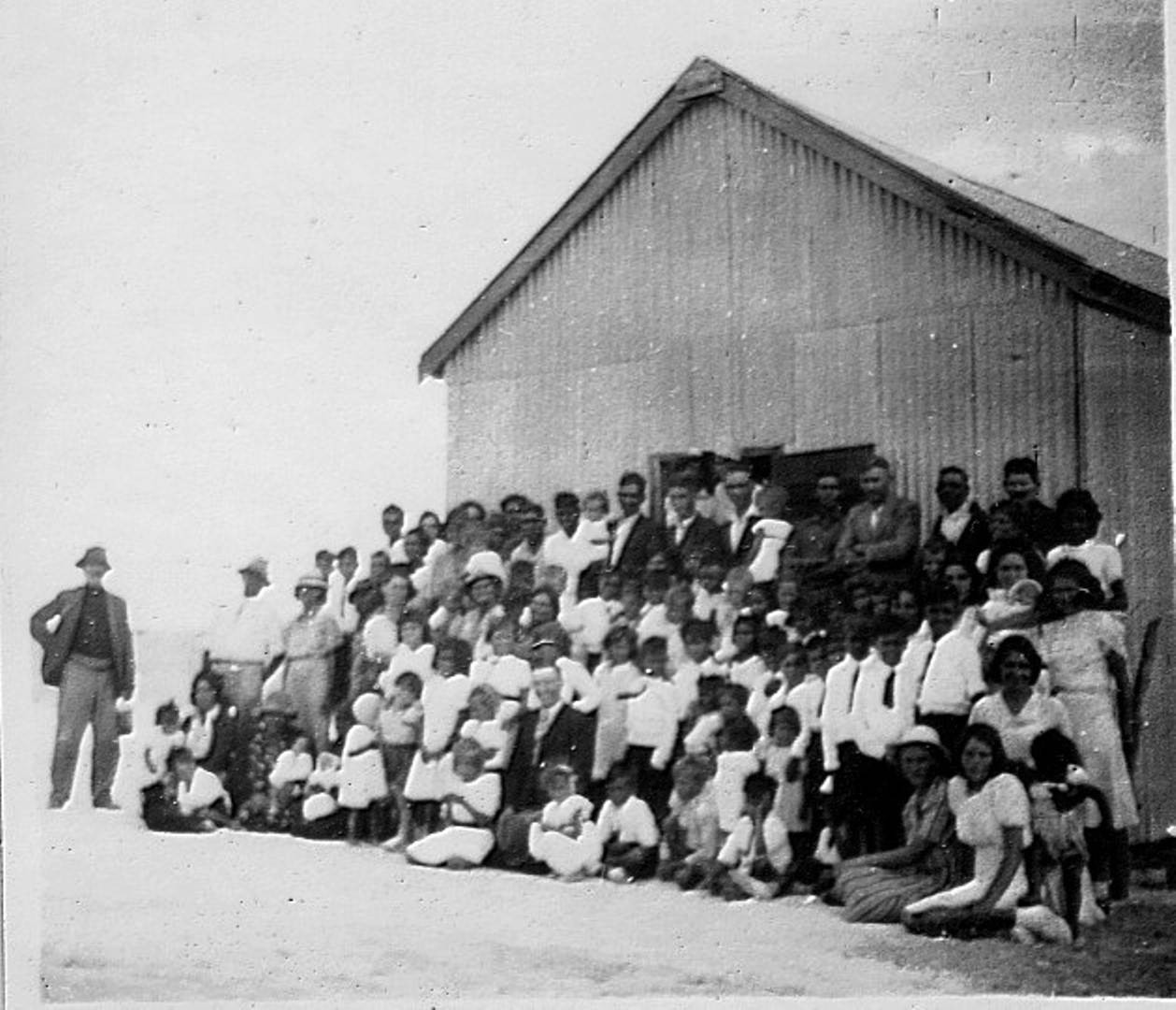
Gnowangerup Mission, the whole camp, Christmas, 1941

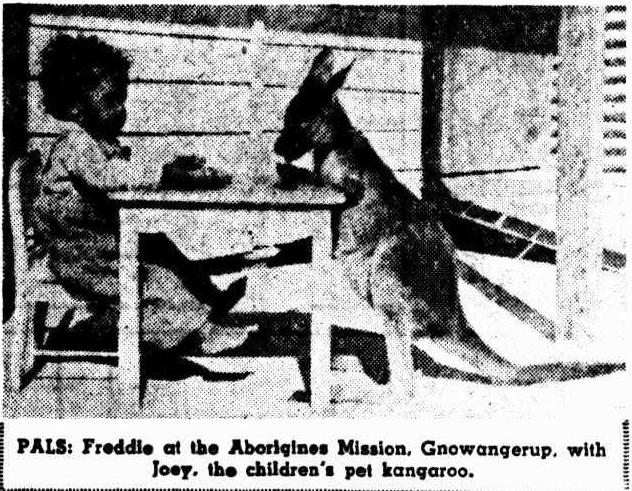
Child and pet kangaroo, Gnowangerup mission, 1953

The Gnowangerup Mission or Gnowangerup Aboriginal Mission, also known as United Aborigines Mission, Gnowangerup, was a Christian mission located in the town of Gnowangerup in the Great Southern region of Western Australia. The mission was sponsored by the United Aborigines Missions, formerly known as Australian Inland Mission.

It was established in 1935 around Muir Hill on the outskirts of the town on 61 hectares (151 acres) of land owned by Hope and Hedley Wright. The Wrights managed the mission on behalf of the United Aborigines Mission. They had previously run for the Australian Aborigines' Mission on the Government Reserve in town between 1926 and 1935.

In 1933 it was suggested that the Carrolup mission be reopened as a ration station for Aboriginal people. Wright and the local community protested about the 60 miles (97 km) distance that would have to be travelled. Wright was a missionary, Protector of Aborigines and rationing officer at Gnowangerup and had contact with 400 Aboriginal people annually.

Officially opened in November 1935 the property had been acquired at a cost of £237 for 190 acres (77 ha) located 1.5 miles (2.4 km) from the townsite. The mission buildings were transferred from the old 6.5-acre (2.6 ha) site.

In 1938 the mission was responsible for 288 people and cost the Department of Native Affairs £88, with most of the people working for their own income.

Many one or two room cottages were built from timber with iron roofs on the mission. Aboriginal people were not permitted into the town after 6.00pm. Some time in the early 1940s a two-room maternity hospital was built in the mission.

The mission property was part of the A$1.3 billion native title deal struck between the state government and the Wagyl Kaip or southern Noongar peoples in 2015. The role of the mission, and the experiences of some of the Aboriginal people who were taken there, is discussed in the 2024 film Genocide in the Wildflower State.

Carol Petterson JP, a member of the Western Australian Aboriginal Advisory Council from 2015 to 2018 at the Department of Aboriginal Affairs, was born at the mission. Eric Hayward, a noted author, was also born at the mission.
