= Kwobrup, Western Australia =

Kwobrup
- Town
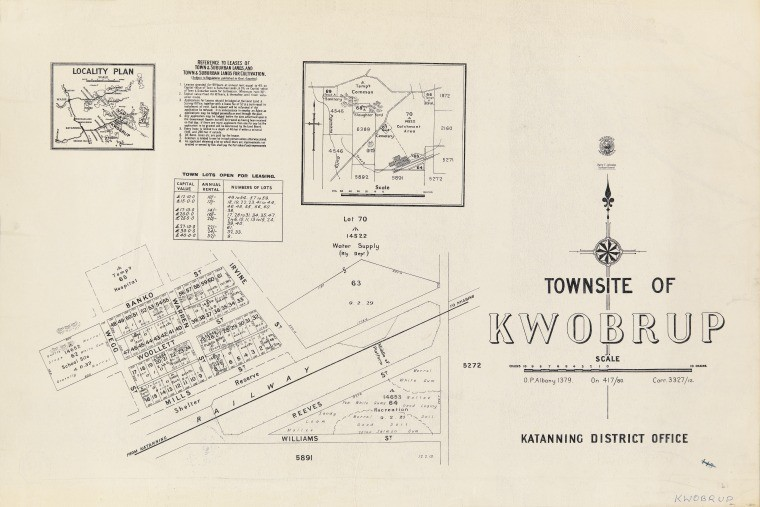
- 1913 map of the townsite of Kwobrup

- Interactive map of Kwobrup
- Coordinates: 33°36′0″S 117°58′0″E
- Country: Australia
- State: Western Australia
- LGA: Shire of Kent
- Location: 329 km (204 mi) SW of Perth; 211 km (131 mi) N of Albany; 43 km (27 mi) E of Katanning

Government
  - State electorate: Roe
  - Federal division: O'Connor

Area
  - Total: 0.4 km^{2} (0.15 sq mi)
- Postcode: 6341

Kwobrup is a small town in the locality of Nyabing, Shire of Kent, in the Great Southern region of Western Australia.

The local hall was a significant facility in the early twentieth century. The Kwobrup Reserve, north of the town, forms part of the Kwobrup-Badgebup Important Bird Area.

Kwobrup was a stop on the Pingrup railway line, and was established as a siding in 1912. Originally called Yellanup, it was seen as to close to the name of Yallingup and alternative name suggestions were made. The first suggestion was Wollakup, which was seen as to close to Wokalup, and Kwobrup was chosen instead, the indigenous name of a nearby swamp, thought to mean "good place".

An official 1913 map of the townsite shows the town north of the railway line and consisting of the north–south running Irvine, Warren and Wegg Streets and the east–west running Banko, Woollett and Mills Streets, with 61 blocks of land allocated along them. A school and temporary hospital site were also marked out, as well as a recreation reserve south of the railway line.
