= Shire of Gnowangerup =

Local government area in the Great Southern region of Western Australia

Coordinates: 33°56′17″S 118°00′29″E

- Local government area
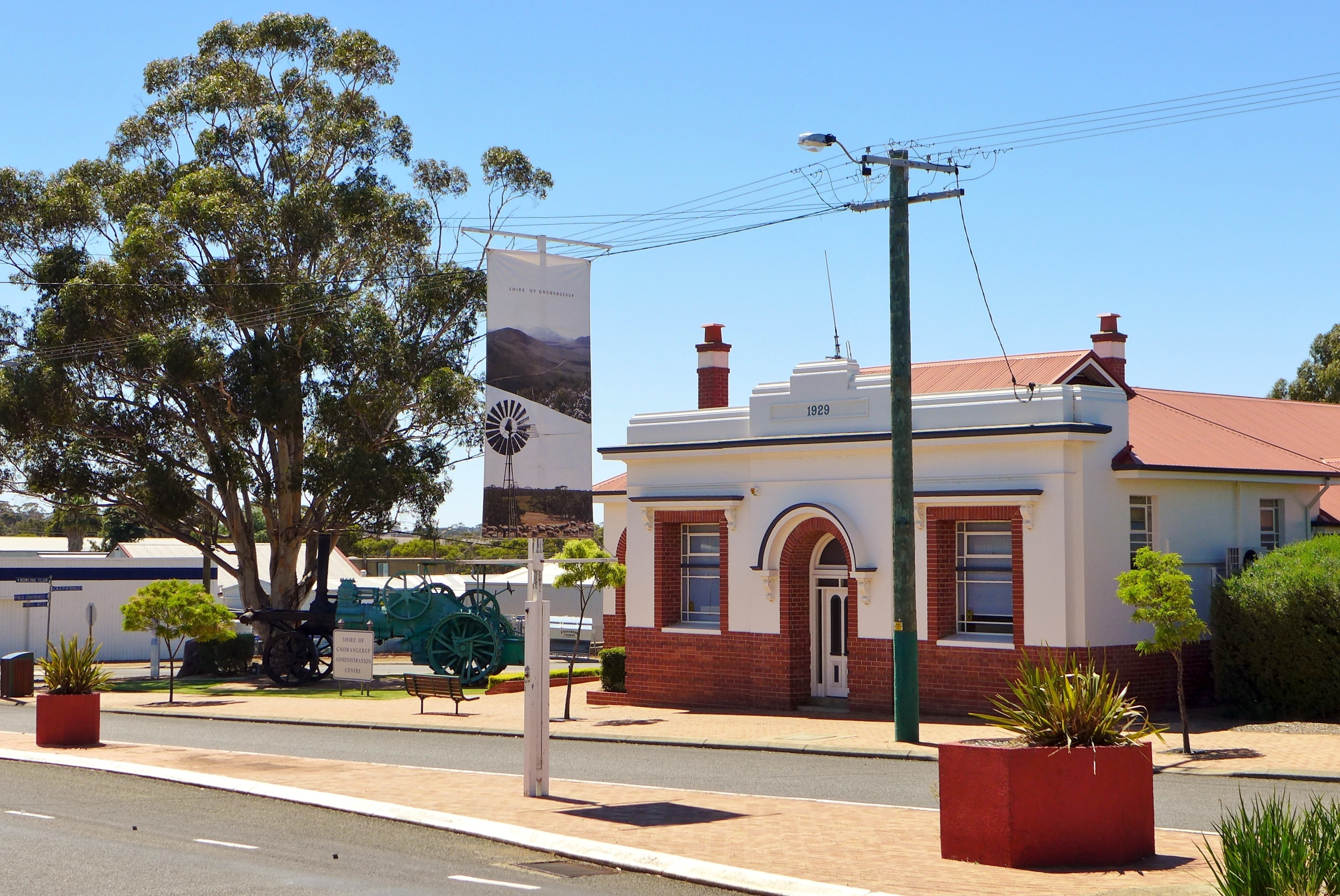
- Gnowangerup shire offices, 2018

- Interactive map of Shire of Gnowangerup
- Country: Australia
- State: Western Australia
- Region: Great Southern
- Established: 1912
- Council seat: Gnowangerup

Government
  - Shire President: Kate O'Keeffe
  - State electorate: Roe
  - Federal division: O'Connor

Area
  - Total: 4,268 km^{2} (1,648 sq mi)

Population
  - Total: 1,215 (2021 census)
  - Density: 0.28468/km^{2} (0.7373/sq mi)
- Website: Shire of Gnowangerup
LGAs around Shire of Gnowangerup
Katanning	Kent	Kent
Broomehill-Tambellup	Shire of Gnowangerup	Jerramungup
Cranbrook	Plantagenet	Albany

The Shire of Gnowangerup is a local government area in the Great Southern region of Western Australia, about 120 kilometres (75 mi) north of Albany and about 370 kilometres (230 mi) southeast of the capital, Perth. The Shire covers an area of 4,268 square kilometres (1,648 sq mi), and its seat of government is the town of Gnowangerup.

== History ==
Gnowangerup was initially gazetted as the Gnowangerup Road District on 26 January 1912, taking in territory that had been part of the Broomehill and Tambellup road districts. On 23 June 1961, it became a shire following the passage of the Local Government Act 1960, which reformed all remaining road districts into shires. On 4 June 1982, the eastern half of the Gnowangerup shire was excised to form the Shire of Jerramungup.

== Indigenous people ==
The Shire of Gnowangerup is located on the traditional land of the Koreng people of the Noongar nation.

== Wards ==
In 1999 the Shire was divided into four wards:

- Borden Ward (two councillors)
- Gnowangerup Ward (three councillors)
- Ongerup Ward (two councillors)
- Rural Ward (two councillors)

Since 2007, when the ward system was discontinued, all councillors have been elected at large from the Gnowangerup district.

The Shire President is chosen from amongst the councillors.

== Towns and localities ==
The towns and localities of the Shire of Gnowangerup with population and size figures based on the most recent Australian census:

Locality	Population	Area	Map
Amelup	71 (SAL 2021)	402.3 km^{2} (155.3 sq mi)	
Borden	37 (SAL 2021)	0.8 km^{2} (0.31 sq mi)	
Cowalellup	19 (SAL 2021)	331.4 km^{2} (128.0 sq mi)	
Gnowangerup	568 (SAL 2021)	3.9 km^{2} (1.5 sq mi)	
Jackitup	53 (SAL 2021)	433.7 km^{2} (167.5 sq mi)	
Kebaringup	49 (SAL 2021)	195.3 km^{2} (75.4 sq mi)	
Magitup	20 (SAL 2021)	238.9 km^{2} (92.2 sq mi)	
Mills Lake	39 (SAL 2021)	360.5 km^{2} (139.2 sq mi)	
Mindarabin	49 (SAL 2021)	550.7 km^{2} (212.6 sq mi)	
Monjebup	21 (SAL 2021)	188.6 km^{2} (72.8 sq mi)	
Nalyerlup	34 (SAL 2021)	291.1 km^{2} (112.4 sq mi)	
North Stirlings	26 (SAL 2021)	247.2 km^{2} (95.4 sq mi)	
Ongerup	114 (SAL 2021)	3.4 km^{2} (1.3 sq mi)	
Pallinup	90 (SAL 2021)	385.5 km^{2} (148.8 sq mi)	
Stirling Range National Park * ‡	0 (SAL 2021)	1,121 km^{2} (433 sq mi)	
Toompup	26 (SAL 2021)	264.5 km^{2} (102.1 sq mi)	

- ( * indicates locality is only partially located within this shire)
- ( ‡ indicates boundaries of national park and locality are not identical)

== Heritage-listed places ==
As of 2023, 115 places are heritage-listed in the Shire of Gnowangerup, of which two are on the State Register of Heritage Places, the Telyarup Homestead and the Gnowangerup Noongar Centre, both located in the town of Gnowangerup.
