= Chester Pass Road =

Road in Western Australia

Chester Pass Road Western Australia
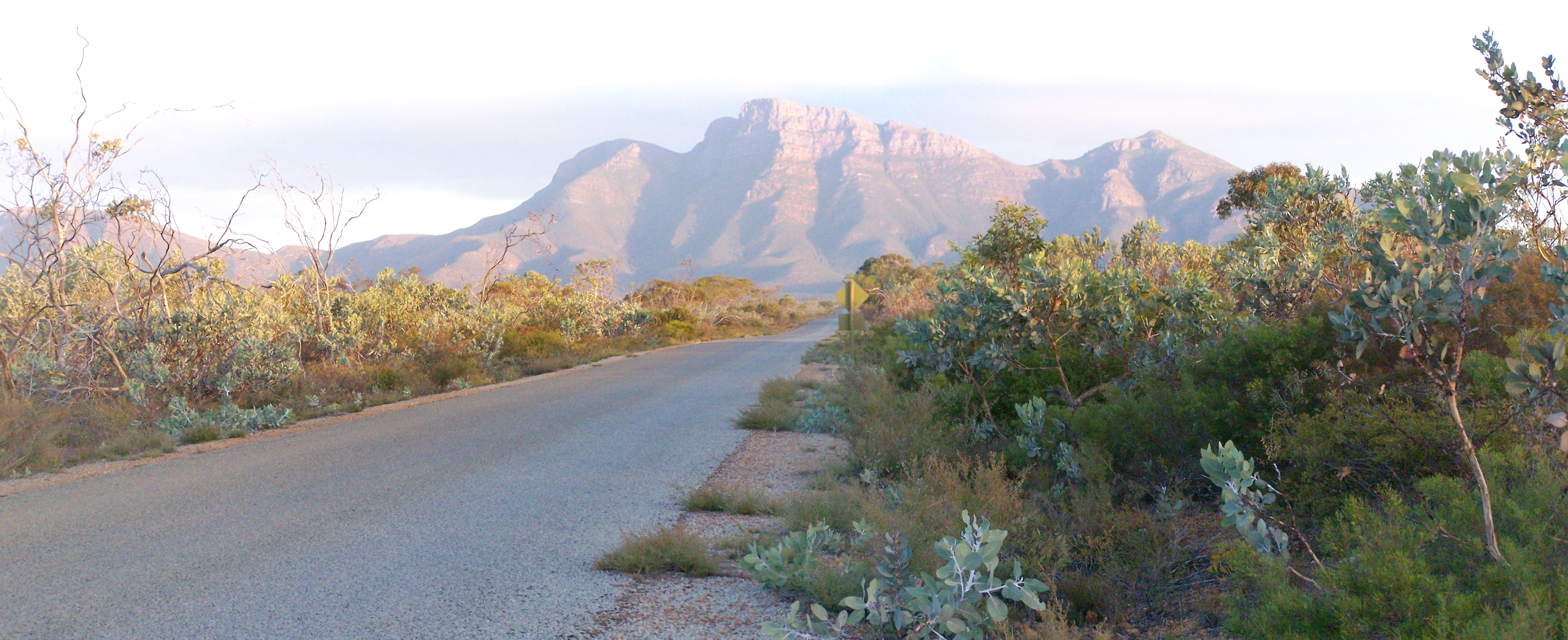
- Bluff Knoll, as seen from near the corner of Chester Pass Road and Bluff Knoll access road

General information
- Type: Road
- Length: 163 km (101 mi)

Major junctions
- South end: South Coast Highway (National Route 1), Albany
- Albany Highway (State Route 30); Menang Drive (State Route 103); South Coast Highway (National Route 1)
- North end: Nyabing-Pingrup Road, Nyabing

Chester Pass Road is a 163-kilometre (101 mi) long road that passes through the Stirling Range between Nyabing and Albany in the Great Southern region of Western Australia. It passes close to the access road to the base of Bluff Knoll.

== History ==
It was being proposed to be constructed in the early 1930s, and at stages was improved through the Stirling Range National Park. Construction of the road commenced in August 1935, starting from the Borden end, with the aim of creating a back road between the former and Albany.

Passing through a series of local government areas, it has had a range of conditions that required levels of maintenance over time. The nomenclature board of WA ratified the name of the road in 1948, from what had been the name Borden Ongerup Road.

The actual Chester Pass is in the Stirling Range, within the Stirling Range National Park, with the Chester Pass Road leading over it. Chester Pass is an approximately 1.2-kilometre (0.75 mi) wide gap in the range.

The road has been named after police constable George Chester, who was stationed at Madgedup police outstation, in present-day Magitup, west of the current road.

== Route ==
The road's southern end is at the Chester Pass Rotary, where the South Coast Highway and the Albany Highway intersect. For its first stretch, it coincides with the South Coast Highway. A major intersection is encountered after 5.5 kilometres (3.4 mi) with Menang Drive prior to crossing the King River. Just under 10 kilometres (6.2 mi) from the roundabout South Coast Highway branches off to the northeast at Bakers Junction. It passes Porongurup National Park to the east before traversing Stirling Range National Park, with the road corridor itself not being part of the national park. The road passes through Amelup before passing Borden to the east and reaching the Gnowangerup-Jerramungup Road in the locality of Toompup, just north of Borden.

For approximately 5 kilometres (3 mi), the road is coincident with the Gnowangerup-Jerramungup Road, before resuming northwards, terminating at the Nyabing-Pingerup Road at Nyabing. For most of its duration, from Bakers Junction to its northern terminus, Main Roads Western Australia lists its road name as Albany-Lake Grace Road and its common usage name as Chester Pass Road. The Albany-Lake Grace Road continues on through the Nyabing-Pingerup Road and Pingerup-Lake Grace Road to Lake Grace.

== See also ==
- Highways in Australia
- List of highways in Western Australia
