= Amelup, Western Australia =

Amelup
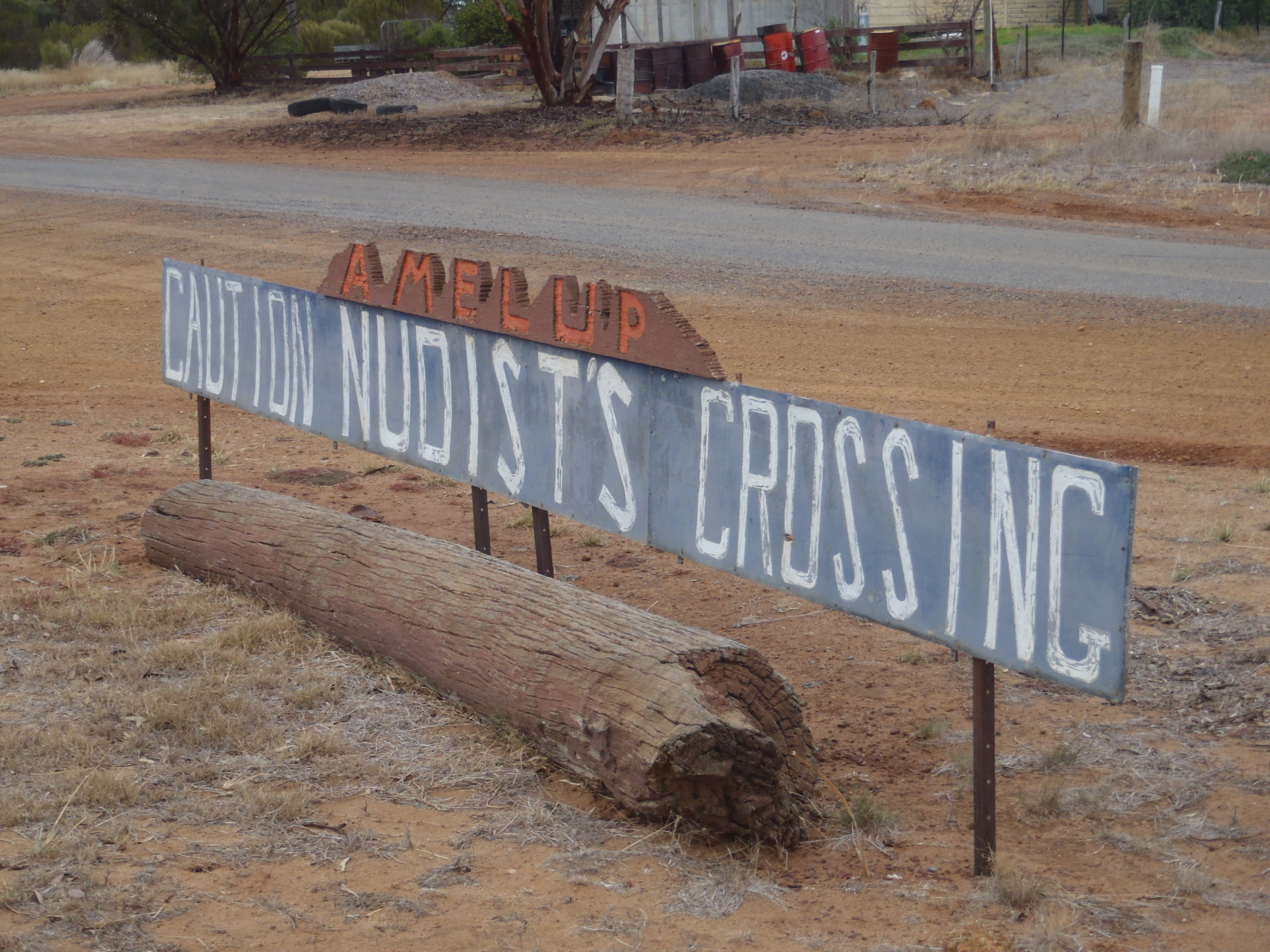
- Nudist crossing sign

- Interactive map of Amelup
- Coordinates: 34°15′10″S 118°13′11″E
- Country: Australia
- State: Western Australia
- LGA: Shire of Gnowangerup
- Location: 336 km (209 mi) south east of Perth; 90 km (56 mi) north of Albany

Government
  - State electorate: Roe
  - Federal division: O'Connor

Area
  - Total: 402.3 km^{2} (155.3 sq mi)

Population
  - Total: 71 (SAL 2021)
- Postcode: 6338

Amelup is a locality in the Shire of Gnowangerup, Great Southern region of Western Australia located on Chester Pass Road, 95 kilometres (59 mi) north-northeast of Albany. At the 2021 census Amelup recorded a population of 71.

The Amelup service station is located 9 km north of the Stirling Range National Park situated between the Stirling Range and Borden.

The area was once a centre of the sandalwood trade, with cutters working the area in the 1890s. Sandalwood Road is a reminder of the town's past. The town has its "CAUTION NUDISTS CROSSING" sign on the main street, the Lily Dutch windmill, and views of the Stirling Range.

The area was opened for selection in 1928 with over 400 acres being allocated.

The locality is sometimes conflated into being part of South Borden, Western Australia, however roadworks by the Gnowangerup local council in the 1920s and 1930s had the locality identified. Most land is now used for cereal cropping and sheep grazing for both wool and meat production.
