= Stirling Range National Park =

National park in Western Australia

- IUCN category II (national park)
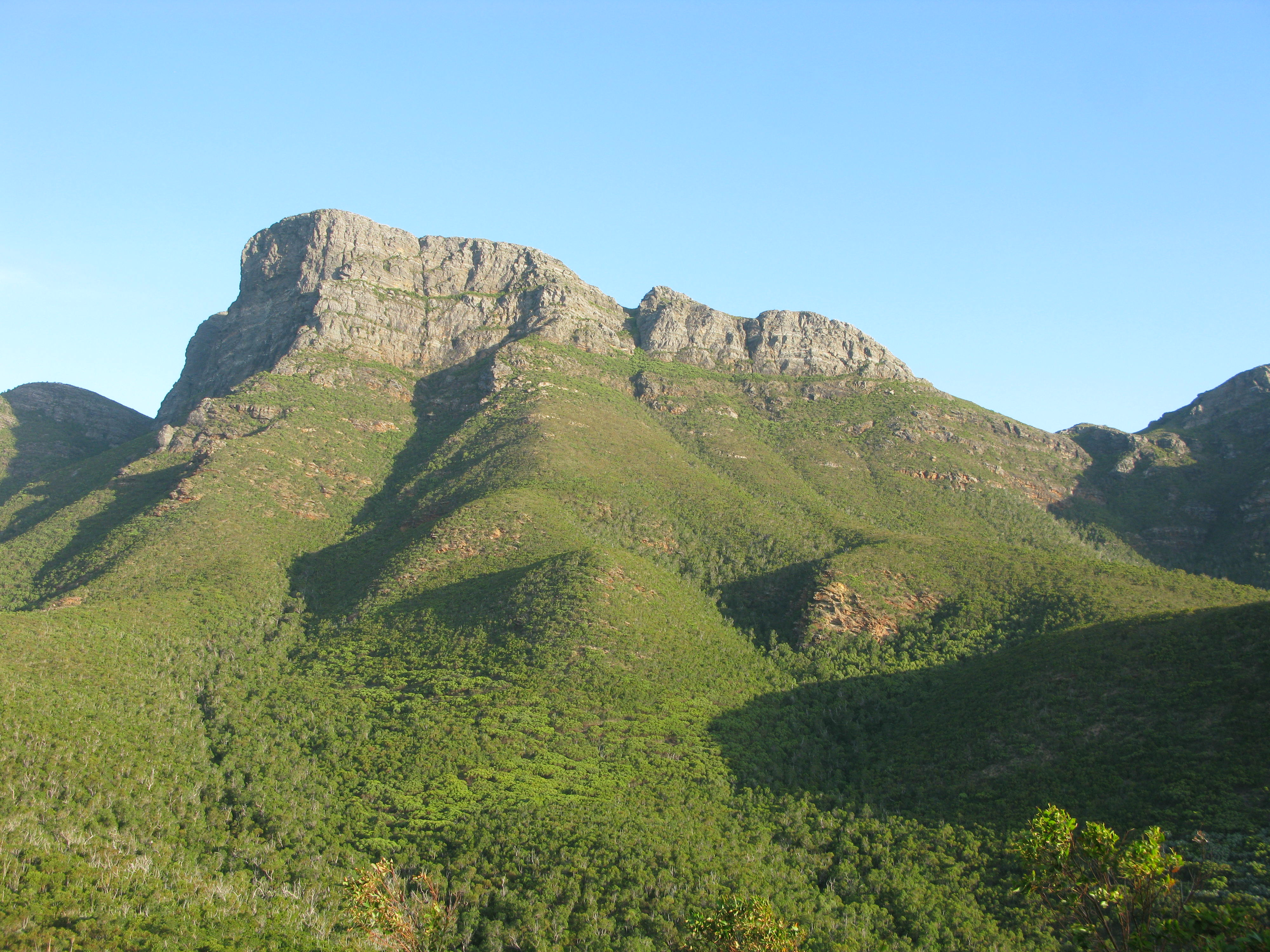
- Bluff Knoll

- Location within Western Australia
- Location: Western Australia
- Nearest city: Cranbrook
- Coordinates: 34°21′50″S 117°59′20″E
- Area: 1,159.2 km^{2} (447.6 sq mi)
- Established: 1913
- Governing body: Department of Parks and Wildlife
- Website: Official website

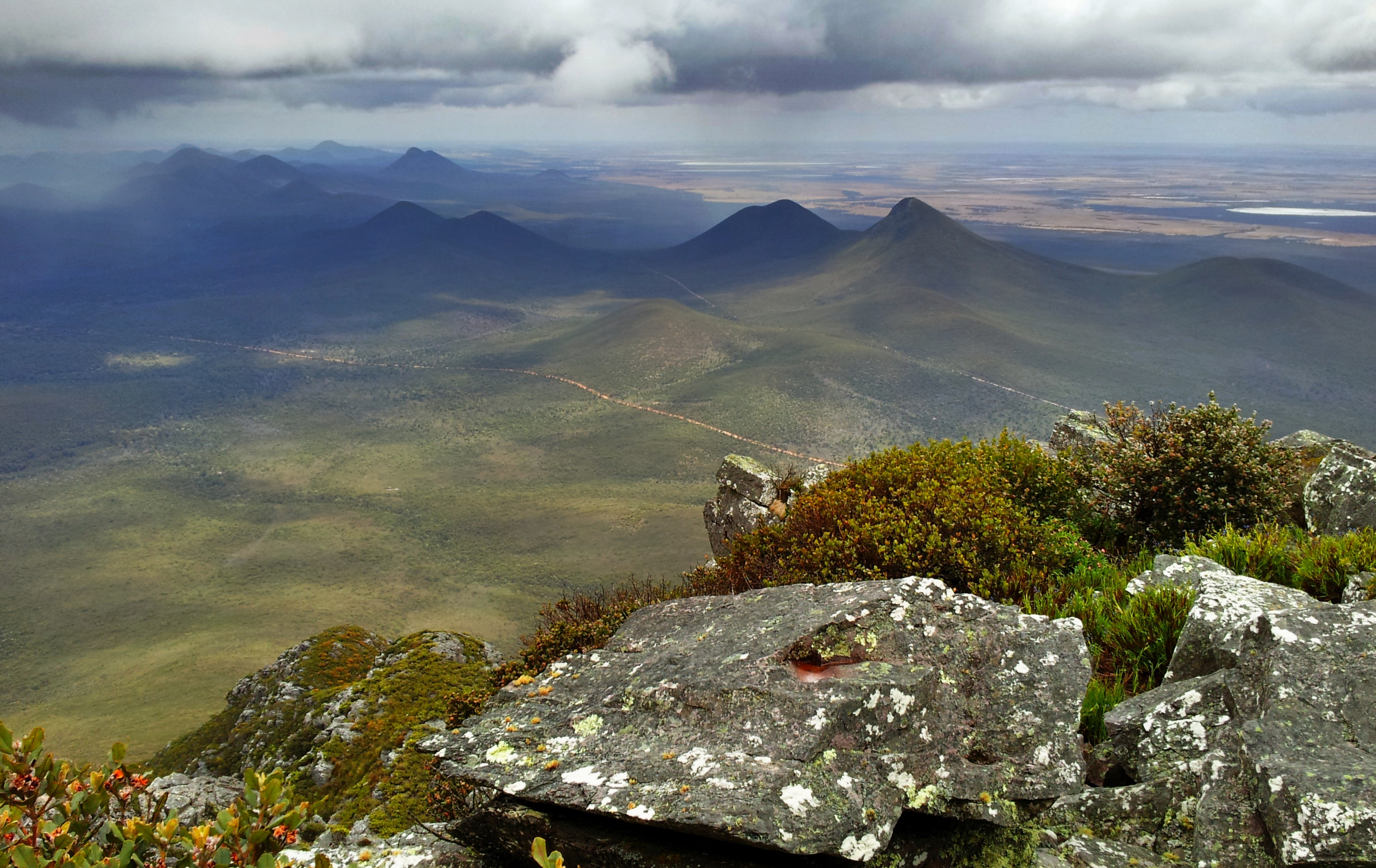
View of Range from Toolbrunup

Stirling Range National Park is a national park in the Great Southern region of Western Australia, approximately 337 kilometres (209 mi) south-east of Perth.

There is also an eponymous locality, stretching across the shires of Cranbrook, Gnowangerup and Plantagenet, but the boundaries of the national park and the locality are not identical.

== Description ==
It protects the Stirling Range (Koikyennuruff or Koi Kyenunu-ruff, meaning 'mist moving around the mountains'), a range of mountains and hills over 65 kilometres (40 mi) wide from west to east, stretching from the highway between Mount Barker and Cranbrook eastward past Gnowangerup. Notable features include Toolbrunup, Bluff Knoll – the tallest peak in the southwestern region – and a silhouette called the Sleeping Princess which is visible from the Porongurup Range.

Popular recreational activities in the park include bushwalking, abseiling and gliding. Camping is permitted only in Moingup campsite within the park boundaries (fee applies). Other peaks which have tracks include Mount Trio, Talyuberlup Peak and Mount Magog. A premier walk known as the Stirling Ridge Walk is usually done over two days and includes Ellen Peak (the most easterly peak) and Bluff Knoll.

== History ==
The traditional owners are the Mineng and Koreng groups of the Noongar peoples who have inhabited the region for tens of thousands of years. The area was important to Indigenous Australians with the surrounding lowlands providing many sources of food. The women gathered seeds, roots and fruit while men hunted kangaroos and other animals.

The first European to sight the range was Matthew Flinders in January 1802 while he was exploring the southern coast of Australia. He named the range Mount Rugged.

Ensign Dale explored the area in 1832 and climbed Toolbrunup.

Stirling Range was named by the surveyor John Septimus Roe in 1835 after the Governor of the Swan River Colony, James Stirling, even though Stirling never actually visited the area.

Sandalwood cutters established a track through the park in about 1848. European settlers arrived in the late 1800s initially around Amelup and farmed much of the surrounding areas. John Forrest climbed Toolbrunup in 1881 with Henry Samuel Ranford and made a cairn at the summit.

The boundaries of the park were first suggested by Jas Hope, the Chief Draftsperson of the Lands and Survey Department, in 1908 and approved by N. J. Moore who was the Minister of Lands at the time.

The National Park was gazetted in 1913 and the first park ranger was appointed in 1964.

The park was listed as a National Heritage place in 2006.

In 2020, a bushfire caused by lightning devastated 40,000 hectares (99,000 acres) of park land.

In August 2022, there was a lot of snow in the park.

== Environment ==
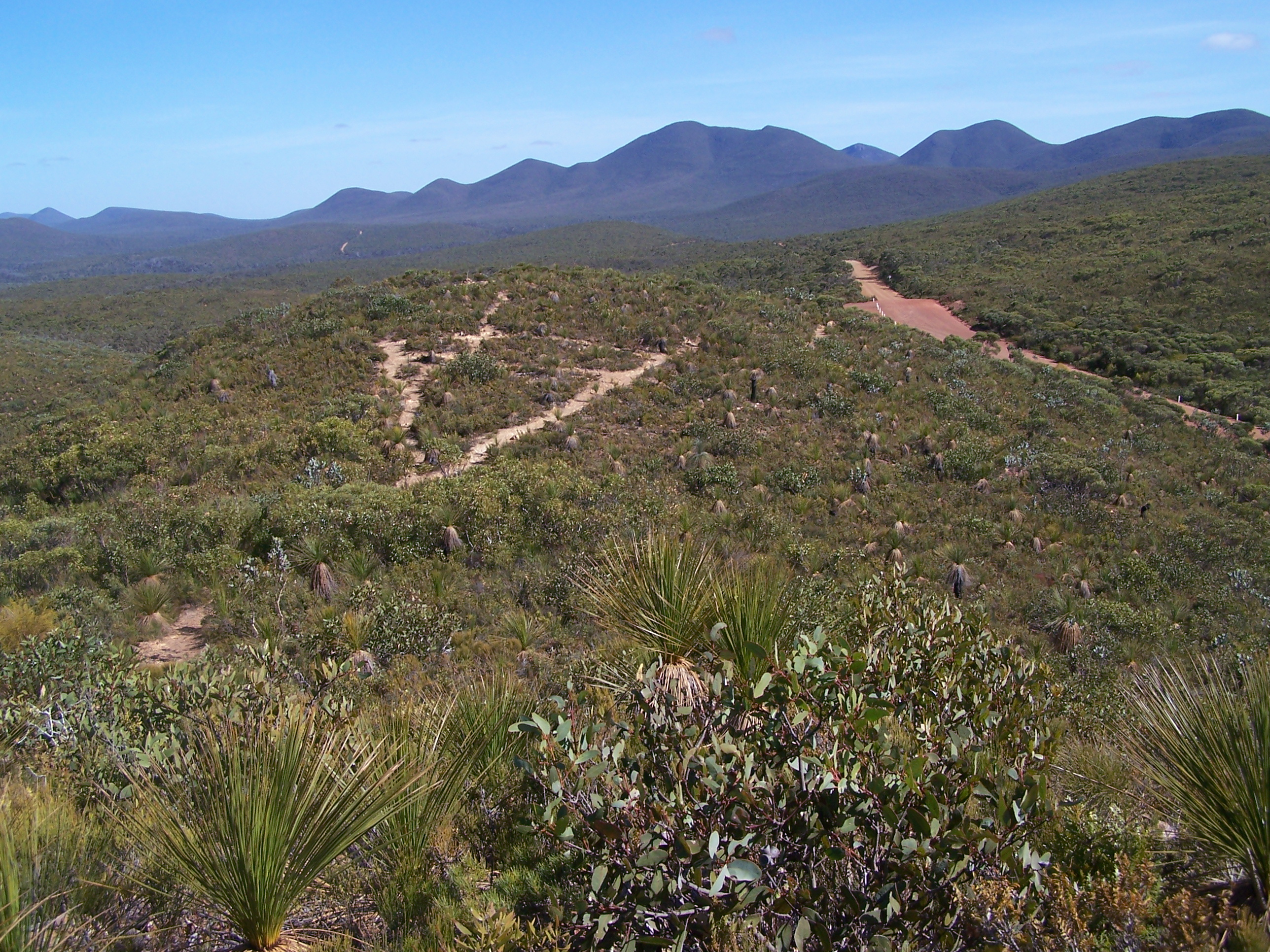
Stirling Range heath

The area is of great biogeographic and evolutionary interest and displays one of the richest floras in the world. The park provides an important refuge for a large diversity of Australia's native plants and animals.

=== Flora ===
Despite the low soils fertility the area supports over 1,500 different flowering plant species with over 87 of the species found only in the area of the park.

The park is particularly rich in banksias, eucalypts, orchids and verticordias. Ten species of mountain bells (Darwinia spp.) have been identified in the park and only one of these is found outside Stirling Range. Five major vegetation communities are known in the park with thicket and mallee-heath at higher elevations and woodlands, wetlands and salt lake communities on the lower slopes and plains. The critically endangered Stirling Range Wattle or Acacia awestoniana is endemic to an area near the park's northern boundary.

=== Fauna ===
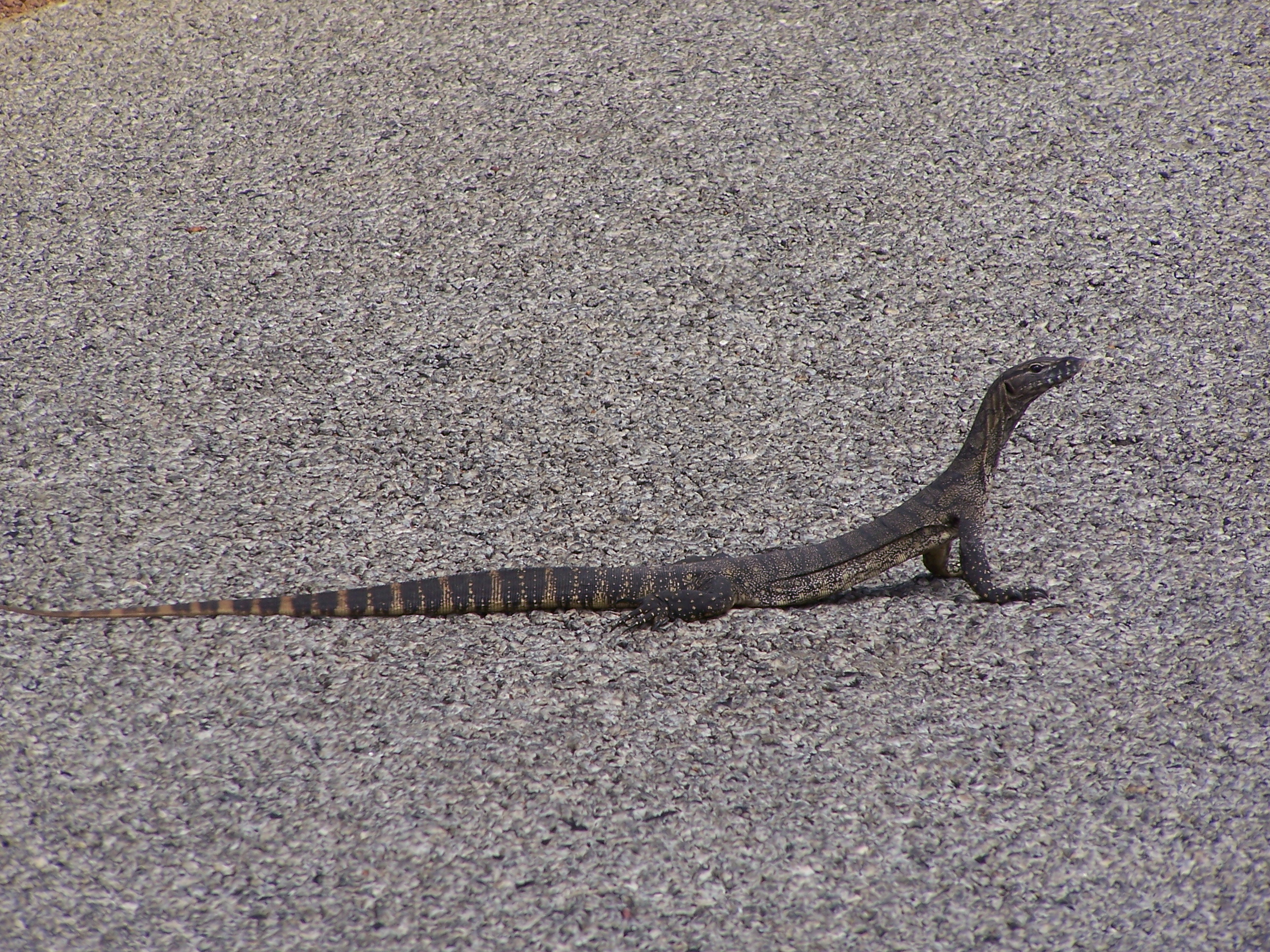
Varanus gouldii on road in park

The park has been identified by BirdLife International as an Important Bird Area (IBA) because it supports populations of endangered short-billed black cockatoos and western whipbirds, and is visited by endangered long-billed black-cockatoos.

Many native mammals are found in the park including the western pygmy possum and the western grey kangaroo.

Deeper shaded gullies support a range ancient species including land snails, trapdoor spiders and giant earthworms that date back over millions of years.

== See also ==
- Protected areas of Western Australia
