= Borden, Western Australia =

Borden
- Town
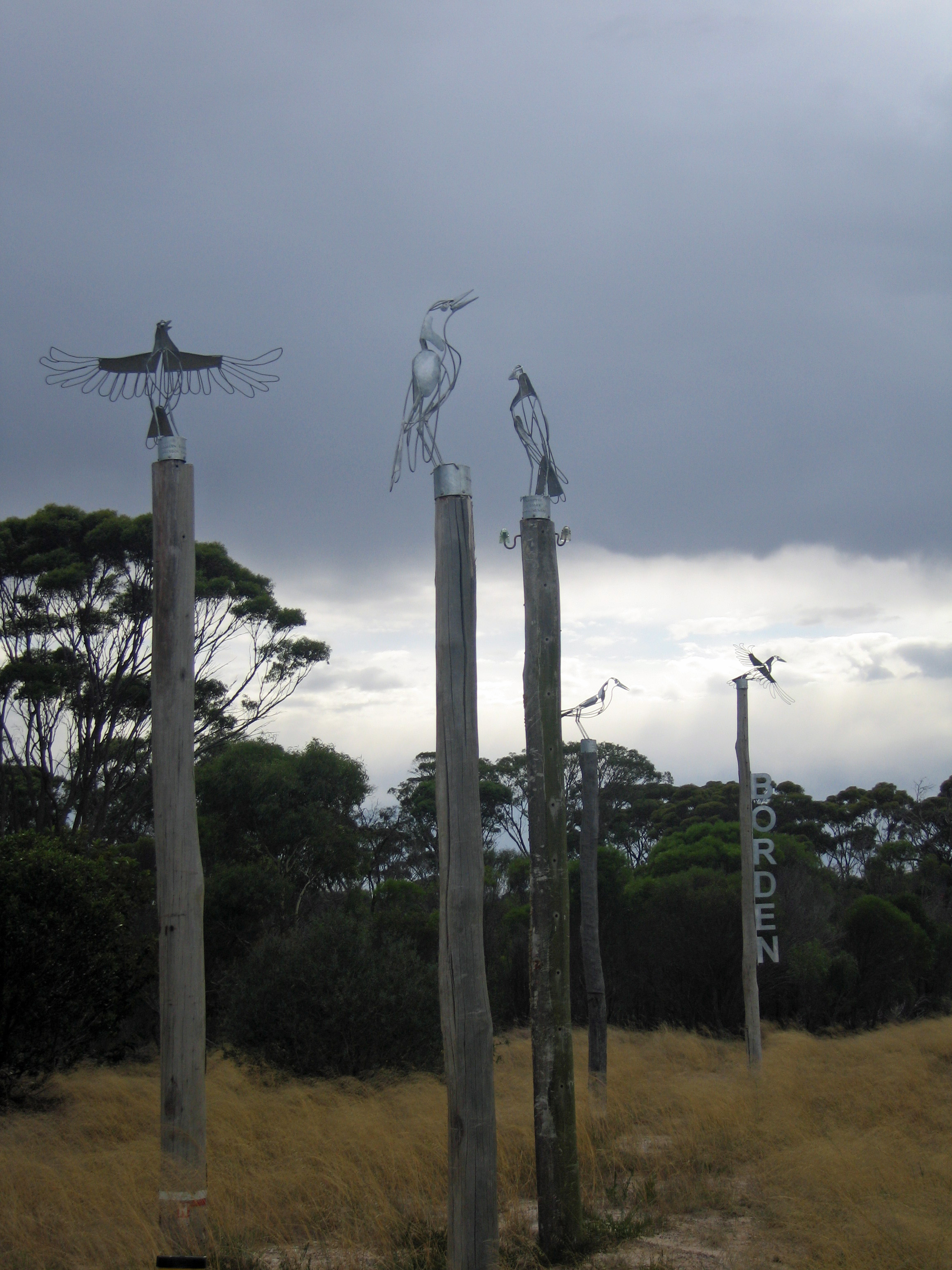
- Welcome to Borden

- Interactive map of Borden
- Coordinates: 34.074°S 118.261°E
- Country: Australia
- State: Western Australia
- LGA: Shire of Gnowangerup
- Location: 325 km (202 mi) from Perth, Western Australia; 111 km (69 mi) from Albany
- Established: 1912

Government
  - State electorate: Roe
  - Federal division: O'Connor

Area
  - Total: 0.8 km^{2} (0.31 sq mi)

Population
  - Total: 37 (SAL 2021)
- Postcode: 6338

Borden is a small town and locality in the Shire of Gnowangerup, Great Southern region of Western Australia. The town is located 325 kilometres (202 mi) south east of the state capital, Perth Western Australia, and 111 kilometres (69 mi) north of Albany on Chester Pass Road. At the 2006 census, Borden and the surrounding area had a population of 164.

The town was established as a siding on the Ongerup branch railway between Gnowangerup and Ongerup and is named after Canadian Prime Minister Sir Robert Borden. The stop after Borden, Laurier, was also named after a Canadian Prime Minister, Sir Wilfrid Laurier. The railway opened for business on 6 January 1913 and closed on 13 October 1957.

The area near Paper Collar Creek near where the town stands was a meeting point for sandalwood cutters in the 1840s for when they used to head to the port at Albany.

In 1916, 250 acres (100 ha) of land was set aside for a townsite. Although the site had not been surveyed J.G. Jenkins had already erected the first building containing dwelling, dining, refreshment and assembly rooms. Another man, J. Copeland was also constructing a building at this time. A telephone connection with Gnowangerup had also been established and mail was being received twice a week by train.

The local agricultural hall, constructed of jarrah and cast iron, was opened in 1928 by the Minister of Lands, Michael H. Troy. Local members H. Stewart and Charles Wittenoom were also present.

The main industry in town is wheat farming, with the town being a Cooperative Bulk Handling receival site. The receival bins are able to handle 170,000 tonnes (167,315 long tons) of grain during harvest times. In 2017 the receival site was inundated with floodwaters following a heavy rain event. The harvest had been a new record so that large amounts of grain were stored in overflow bins.
