= Ongerup, Western Australia =

Town in Western Australia

Ongerup
- Town
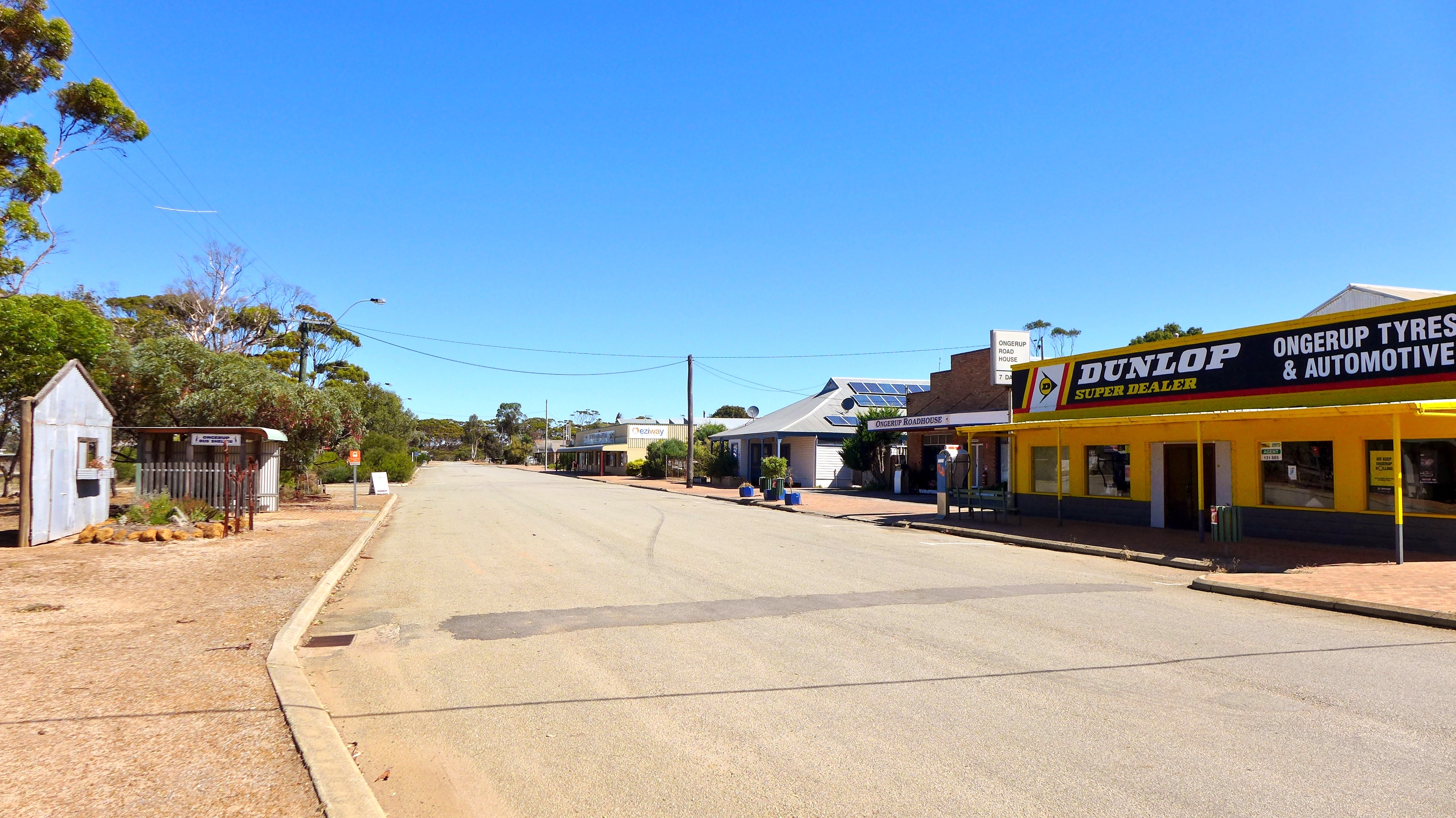
- Eldridge Street, Ongerup, 2018

- Interactive map of Ongerup
- Coordinates: 33.966°S 118.488°E
- Country: Australia
- State: Western Australia
- Region: Great Southern
- LGA: Shire of Gnowangerup
- Location: 410 km (250 mi) SE of Perth; 150 km (93 mi) NNE of Albany; 54 km (34 mi) E of Gnowangerup; 40 km (25 mi) W of Jerramungup
- Established: 1912

Government
  - State electorate: Roe
  - Federal division: O'Connor

Area
  - Total: 3.4 km^{2} (1.3 sq mi)

Population
  - Total: 114 (SAL 2021)
- Postcode: 6336
- Mean max temp: 21.6 °C (70.9 °F)
- Mean min temp: 9.7 °C (49.5 °F)
- Annual rainfall: 387.3 mm (15.25 in)

Ongerup is a town and locality in the Shire of Gnowangerup, Great Southern region of Western Australia. It is 410 kilometres (250 mi) south-east of Perth and 54 kilometres (34 mi) east of Gnowangerup. At the 2021 census Ongerup had a population of 114.

== History ==
The name Ongerup means "place of the male kangaroo" in the local Noongar language.

The area around Ongerup was explored by Surveyor General John Septimus Roe who passed through in 1848. In the 1870s the Moir family moved to the area and began grazing sheep along the Warperup Creek. In 1910 the land was surveyed into 1,000-acre (4 km^{2}) blocks priced at 10 shillings per acre before the townsite was gazetted in 1912.

A local newspaper, The Gnowangerup Star and Tambellup-Ongerup Gazette, was launched on 21 August 1915 with the final edition being printed in 2003.

The first Ongerup Public Hall was built in 1927 but was replaced by the current building in 1953.

During the Great Depression of the 1930s, kangaroo hunters and mallee bark strippers came to the area. The bark was sent to Germany for use in tanning.

In 1936 the town established a football club. The club initially played in the Tambellup Football Association before joining with Jerramungup to form the Ongerup Football Association in 1962. The club went into recess in 2010.

The town was flooded when 119.4 millimetres (4.70 in) of rain, almost a third of the annual average, fell in one day on 17 February 1955.

In June 1983 the Ongerup Cemetery received its first burial.

The Ongerup Shears event was held from 1983 to 2003. It was a shearing competition held on the September Queen's Birthday long weekend with international and national shearers competing in the runup to the Perth Royal Show.

In 2009 a 13-part documentary, entitled The Life of the Town, was made by Ronin Films that looked at the life of the town and focused on the Australian Rules football team that was under threat.

In March 2010 the Ongerup Police Station (established 1962) was moved 65 kilometres (40 mi) to the east to Jerramungup in response to the increased populations of Jerramungup and Bremer Bay.

In 2012 the town celebrated its centenary with a programme of various events.

Ongerup featured in an episode of the ABC television series Back Roads that aired on 8 October 2024.

== Climate ==
Climate data for Ongerup (1991–2020 normals, extremes 1966–present)
Month	Jan	Feb	Mar	Apr	May	Jun	Jul	Aug	Sep	Oct	Nov	Dec	Year
Record high °C (°F)	44.5 (112.1)	45.0 (113.0)	40.5 (104.9)	36.7 (98.1)	32.7 (90.9)	25.0 (77.0)	23.2 (73.8)	27.5 (81.5)	32.7 (90.9)	38.1 (100.6)	40.8 (105.4)	42.6 (108.7)	45.0 (113.0)
Mean daily maximum °C (°F)	28.7 (83.7)	28.2 (82.8)	26.2 (79.2)	23.1 (73.6)	19.3 (66.7)	16.4 (61.5)	15.3 (59.5)	16.2 (61.2)	18.0 (64.4)	21.6 (70.9)	24.9 (76.8)	26.7 (80.1)	22.1 (71.8)
Daily mean °C (°F)	21.4 (70.5)	21.3 (70.3)	19.9 (67.8)	17.2 (63.0)	13.9 (57.0)	11.5 (52.7)	10.6 (51.1)	11.0 (51.8)	12.3 (54.1)	15.0 (59.0)	17.8 (64.0)	19.6 (67.3)	16.0 (60.8)
Mean daily minimum °C (°F)	14.1 (57.4)	14.5 (58.1)	13.5 (56.3)	11.3 (52.3)	8.6 (47.5)	6.7 (44.1)	5.8 (42.4)	5.9 (42.6)	6.6 (43.9)	8.4 (47.1)	10.6 (51.1)	12.4 (54.3)	9.9 (49.8)
Record low °C (°F)	6.2 (43.2)	5.6 (42.1)	3.3 (37.9)	1.9 (35.4)	−0.9 (30.4)	−1.1 (30.0)	−2.0 (28.4)	−1.2 (29.8)	−2.2 (28.0)	−0.8 (30.6)	0.3 (32.5)	4.0 (39.2)	−2.2 (28.0)
Average precipitation mm (inches)	20.4 (0.80)	20.6 (0.81)	26.0 (1.02)	25.5 (1.00)	36.8 (1.45)	41.9 (1.65)	44.5 (1.75)	48.9 (1.93)	40.4 (1.59)	30.4 (1.20)	30.3 (1.19)	25.5 (1.00)	391.0 (15.39)
Average precipitation days (≥ 1 mm)	2.9	2.8	3.6	3.9	6.4	8.8	9.9	10.3	8.9	5.8	4.7	3.6	71.7
Average dew point °C (°F)	10.8 (51.4)	11.6 (52.9)	11.1 (52.0)	10.3 (50.5)	8.7 (47.7)	7.4 (45.3)	6.9 (44.4)	7.3 (45.1)	7.2 (45.0)	7.5 (45.5)	8.5 (47.3)	9.0 (48.2)	8.9 (48.0)
Source 1: National Oceanic and Atmospheric Administration
Source 2: Bureau of Meteorology

== Railway ==
A 94-kilometre (58 mi) branch line to Ongerup from Tambellup on the Great Southern Railway main line between Perth and Albany was opened on 6 January 1913 to serve the growing agricultural industry; it closed on 13 October 1957. A timetable from 1937 shows two trains per week leaving Ongerup on Tuesdays at 06:55 and Fridays at 04:00. Lengthy connections of around 12 hours were available at Katanning for Perth, arriving approximately 30 hours after leaving Ongerup. The situation of two trains a week had not changed much by 1948.

In 1918 a barracks was constructed on Eldridge Street for railway workers based in Ongerup. The building survived the closure of the railway and now houses the Ongerup & Needilup District Museum that was opened in 1978.

== Economy and demographics ==
The town exists to service the local agricultural community. Surrounding farms mainly produce wheat, barley, canola and wool, while lesser quantities of lupins, oats, alfalfa and other crops are also grown. Beef cattle, fat lambs, and pigs are sideline industries. Grain silos belonging to Cooperative Bulk Handling are located at Ongerup and during harvest time these silos store grain from surrounding farms before it is transported to Albany by road for export.

At the 2021 census Ongerup had a population of 93 people, a 22% decrease from the 2006 census. In July 2023, the population was 114.

== Attractions and facilities ==
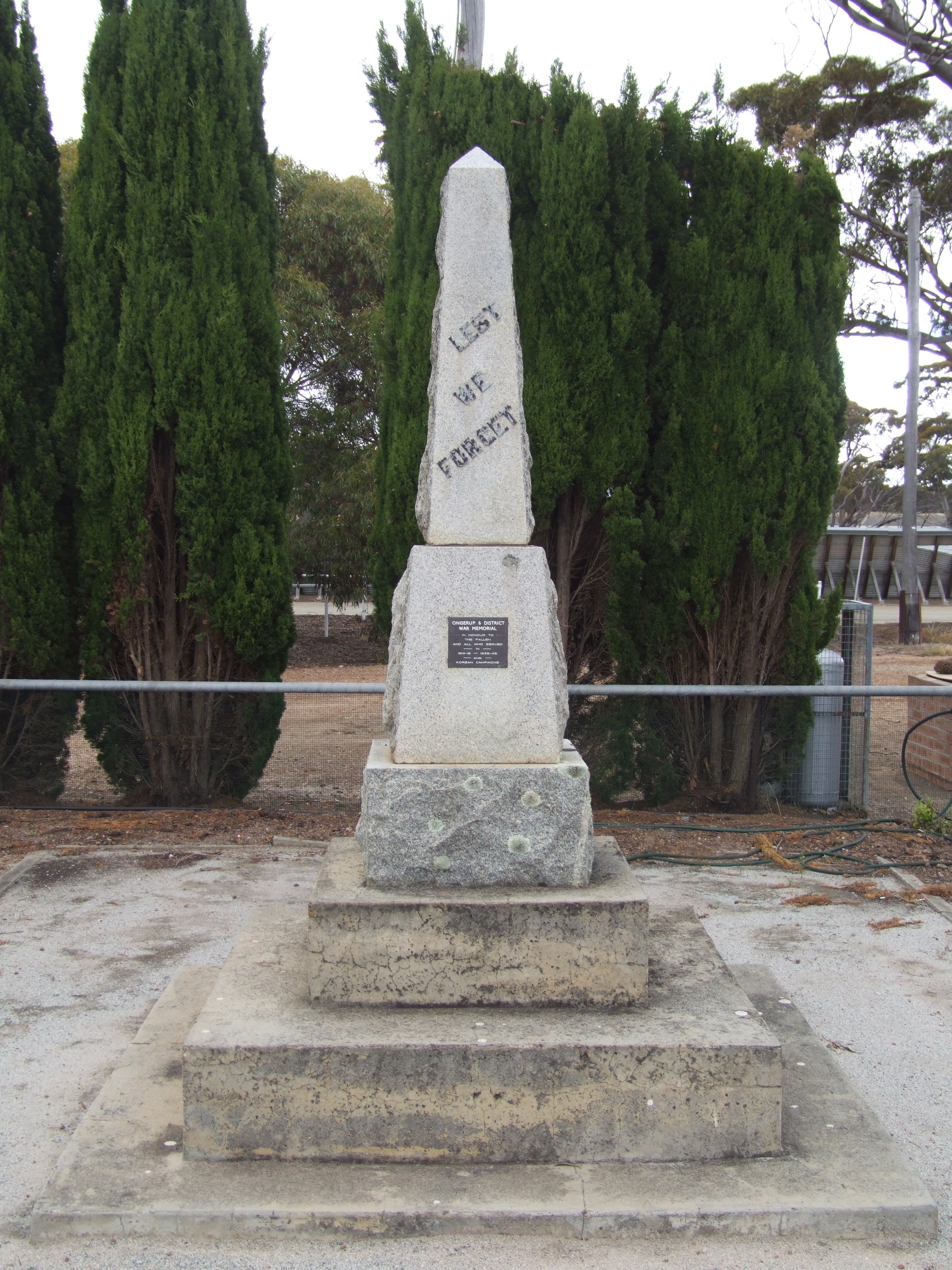
Ongerup War Memorial

A war memorial commemorates the 63 Ongerup lives lost in World War I, World War II, the Korean War and the Vietnam War.

The town is home to a pub, general store, tyre service, primary school, kindergarten, telecentre, caravan park, ambulance service, 18-hole golf course, sports oval and pavilion, roadhouse and local museum.

The pub, supermarket, cafe, and petrol station were purchased by the community after they had threatened to close. They have also invested in new housing, with the aid of a government grant, to be available for rental.

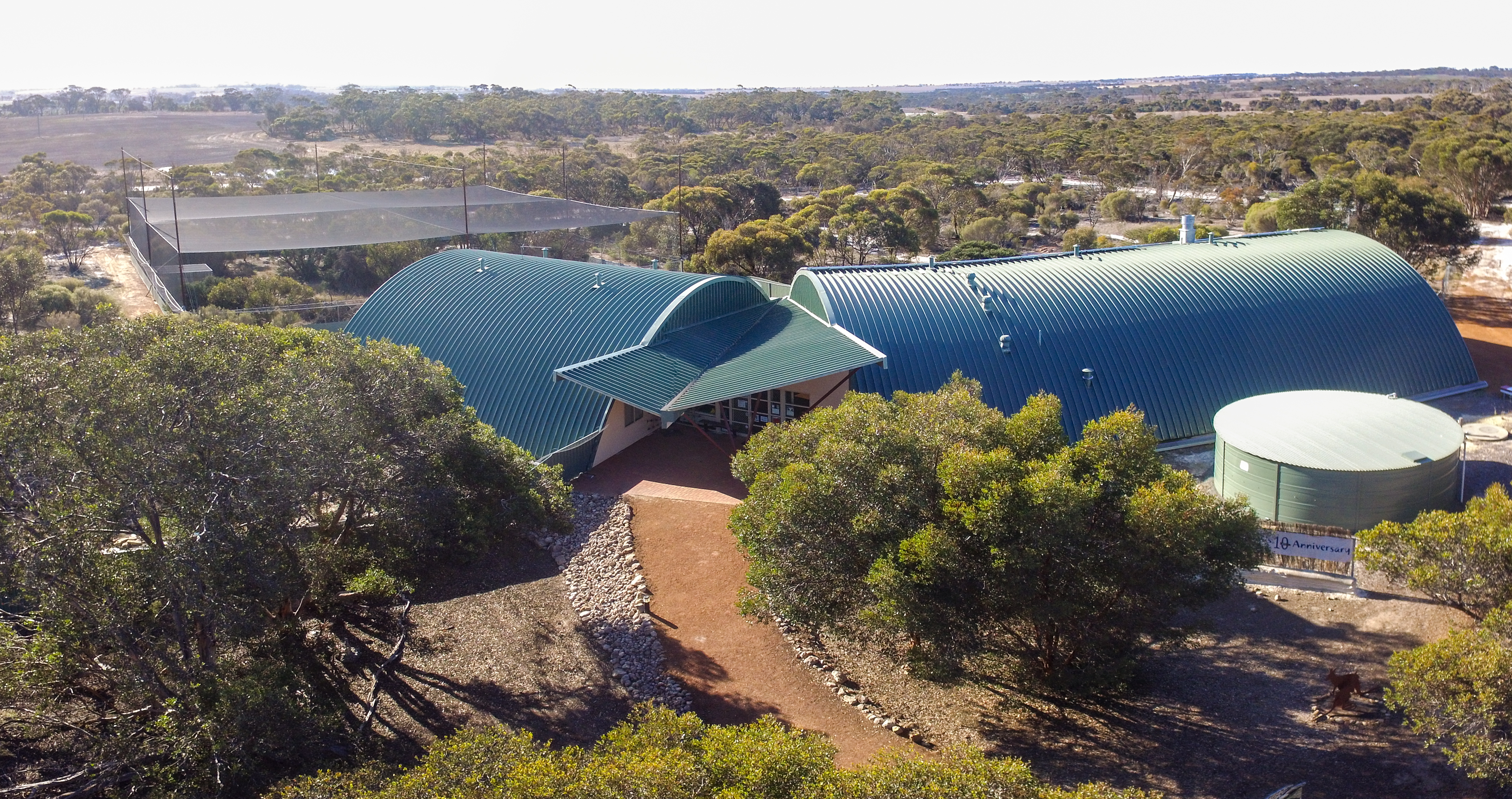
Yongergnow Australian Malleefowl Centre

The town was home to the Malleefowl Preservation Group which operated until 2015. In 2007 the Yongergnow Australian Malleefowl Centre was opened. Yongergnow is set up an educational tourism hub, with the malleefowl as its focal point. The Centre includes two aviaries that contain malleefowl, a gallery housing temporary exhibitions including Noongar and other local art. There is an informative multi-media display area where you can learn more about the conservation of the Malleefowl and local history.

At the sports pavilion, tennis and lawn bowls are played in summer. During winter golf is played the Ongerup Golf Club on an 18-hole course.

The Ongerup Wildflower Show is held in September and October each year in the Ongerup Museum. The Ongerup district is known to be home to over 1,300 species of wildflowers.

Ongerup is a stop on the Transwa bus service between Perth and Esperance.

== Notable people ==
Mark Williams, a former AFL player with Hawthorn and Essendon, played for Ongerup Football Club as a junior player.
