= Koreng =

Aboriginal group of Western Australia

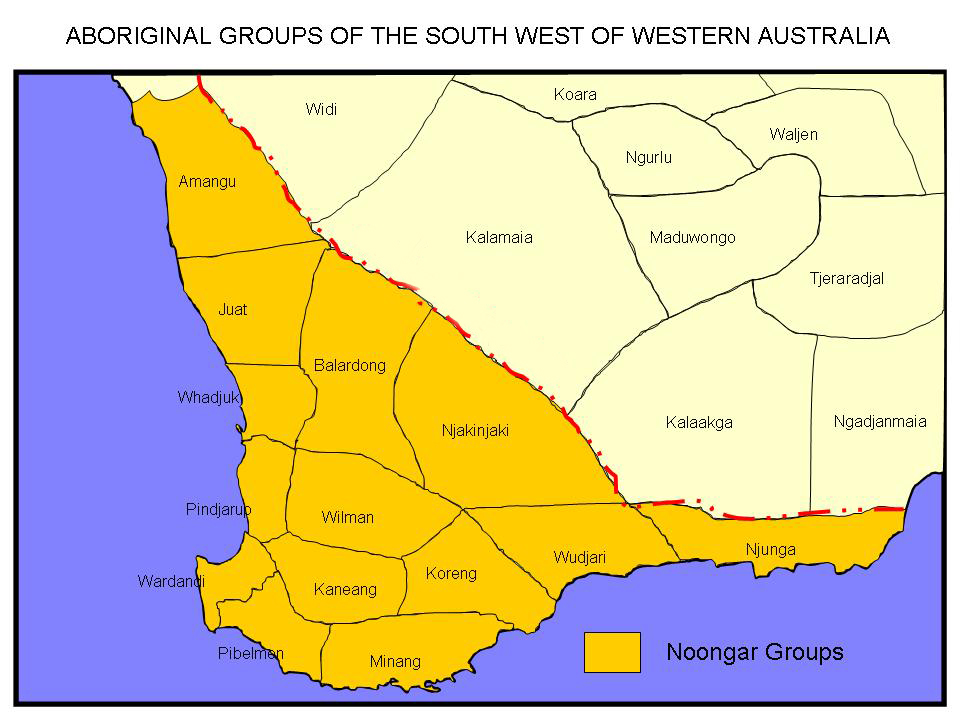
Noongar language groups

The Koreng, also spelled Goreng, are an indigenous Noongar people of south-west of Western Australia.

== Language ==
Koreng belonged to the Nyungic language family, and, specifically, the Koreng appear to have spoken the Wilmun dialect of Nyungar.

== Country ==
The total area of lands of which the Koreng are traditional owners is 15,600 square kilometres (6,023 sq mi) from the Gairdner River to the Bremer Bay inland to Jerramungup, Pingrup and west to Tambellup and Gnowangerup. Their neighbouring tribes were the Wiilman to the north, the Njakinjaki, northeast by north, the Mineng, directly south, the Wiilman to the north, the Pibelmen in the southwest, and the Kaneang on their western flank.

== History of contact ==
Koreng lands began to be expropriated in 1859, at a time when white settlers estimated their numbers to be about 500. Within a little over two decades, these had been reduced to 200 (1880).

== Burial rites ==
Koreng people were buried in oval sandpits, roughly 3 feet (0.9 m) deep, facing east. The knees are bent up and then bound, with the right hand forefinger and thumb, the latter's nail having previously been burnt off, tied in a ligature. The purpose of this nail burning and bondage is to ensure that the dead person will not dig his way out of his grave, and, returning, be capable of wielding his spears. The overburden of earth dug out to excavate the burial site must not be used to fill the grave, which is otherwise covered with bark, rushes and sticks. A fire is then kindled, his worldly goods, including his broken spears, are then laid nearby, and trees are scarred with rings to mark the site.

== Mythology ==
A considerable amount of information concerning Koreng mythology was written down in the 1880s by Edith Hassell, wife of Albert Young Hassell. The manuscript was neglected until it was turned up by the visiting American anthropologist Daniel Sutherland Davidson in 1930. Davidson edited the material for the English journal Folklore over 1934–1935, and this remains an important resource for reconstructing Koreng traditions.

== Native title ==
The Wagyl Kaip and Southern Noongar claim for native title was made in September 2006.

== Alternative names ==
- Ko:rengi
- Kuriny, Corine
- Cororan
- Bremer Bay tribe
- Warangu, Warrangoo
- Warranger, Warrangle
- Kojonup
- Stirling tribe
- Mongup
- Kokar (east)
- Kaialiwongi (kaiali = north, Minang people name for their language)

== Some words ==
- mam (father)
- ngangk (mother)
- twurt (tame dog)
- moakin (wild dog)
- nyituing (white man)
- nawp (baby)

== Sources ==
- "About The Wagyl Kaip and Southern Noongar Region". South West Aboriginal Land and Sea Council.
- "AIATSIS map of Indigenous Australia". AIATSIS.
- Graham, W. H. (1886). "Kojonup and Eticup tribe" (PDF). In Curr, Edward Micklethwaite (ed.). The Australian race: its origin, languages, customs, place of landing in Australia and the routes by which it spread itself over the continent. Vol. 1. Melbourne: J. Ferres. pp. 348–351.
- Hassell, Edith (September 1934a). Davidson, D. S. (ed.). "Myths and Folktales of the Wheelman Tribe of South-Western Australia". Folklore. 45 (3): 232–248. doi:10.1080/0015587X.1934.9718560. JSTOR 1256168.
- Hassell, Edith (December 1934b). Davidson, D. S. (ed.). "Myths and Folktales of the Wheelman Tribe of South-Western Australia. 11". Folklore. 45 (4): 317–341. doi:10.1080/0015587X.1934.9718572. JSTOR 1257857.
- Hassell, Edith (June 1935a). Davidson, D. S. (ed.). "Myths and Folk-Tales of the Wheelman Tribe of South-Western Australia. III". Folklore. 46 (2): 122–147. doi:10.1080/0015587X.1935.9718592. JSTOR 1257649.
- Hassell, Edith (September 1935b). Davidson, D. S. (ed.). "Myths and Folk-Tales of the Wheelman Tribe of South-Western Australia: IV". Folklore. 46 (3): 268–281. doi:10.1080/0015587X.1935.9718605. JSTOR 1257385.
- "Tindale Tribal Boundaries" (PDF). Department of Aboriginal Affairs, Western Australia. September 2016. Archived from the original (PDF) on 8 March 2016.
- Tindale, Norman Barnett (1974). "Koreng (WA)". Aboriginal Tribes of Australia: Their Terrain, Environmental Controls, Distribution, Limits, and Proper Names. Australian National University. ISBN 978-0-708-10741-6. Archived from the original on 4 March 2016.
