= Gnowangerup, Western Australia =

Gnowangerup
- Town
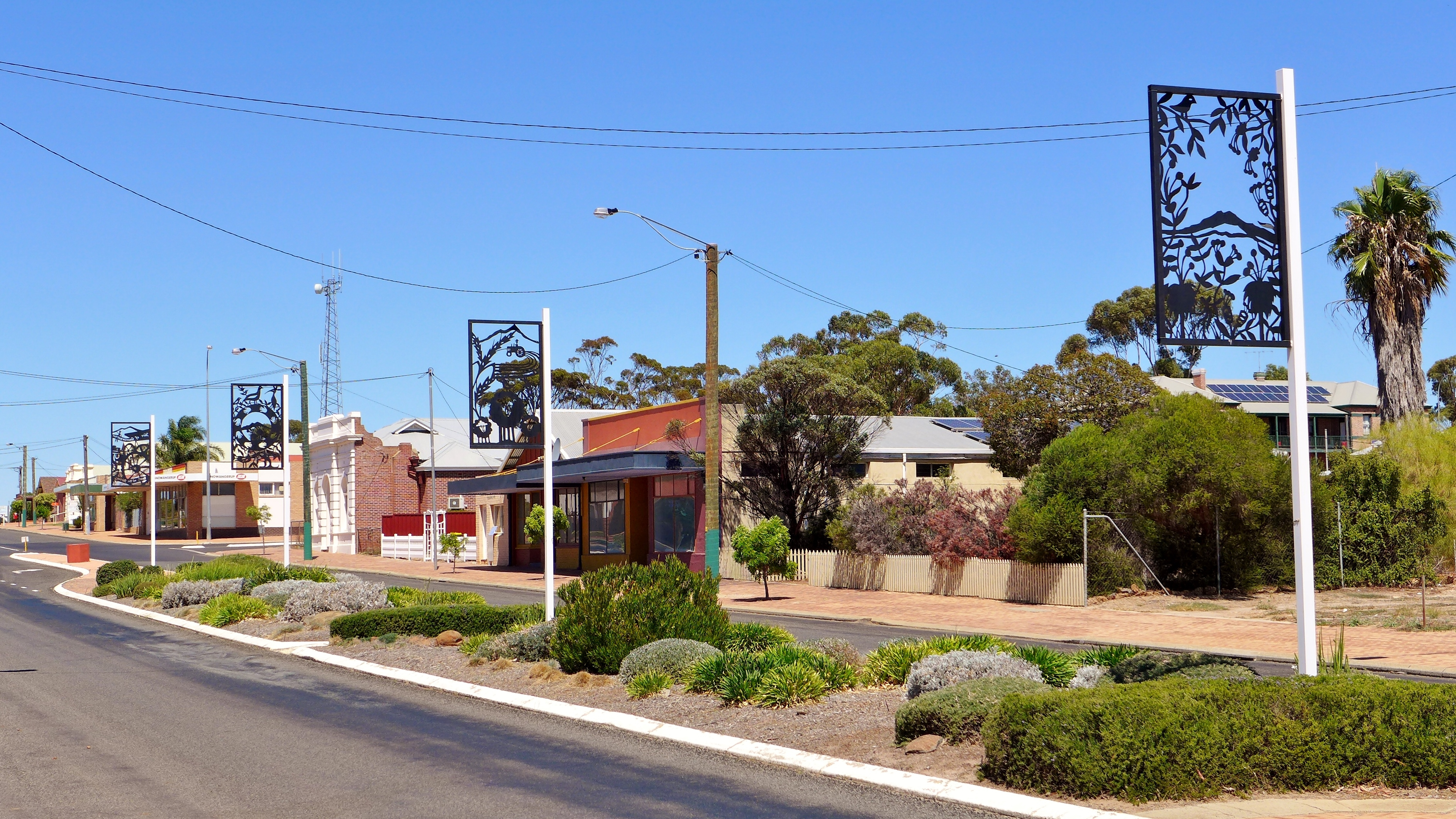
- Yougenup Road, Gnowangerup

- Coordinates: 33.94°S 118.01°E
- Country: Australia
- State: Western Australia
- LGA(s): Shire of Gnowangerup
- Location: 355 km (221 mi) SE of Perth; 61 km (38 mi) SE of Katanning; 83 km (52 mi) NE of Mount Barker
- Established: 1908

Government
  - State electorate(s): Roe
  - Federal division(s): O'Connor

Area
  - Total: 3.9 km^{2} (1.5 sq mi)
- Elevation: 261 m (856 ft)

Population
  - Total(s): 568 (SAL 2021)
- Postcode: 6335

Gnowangerup is a town located 61 kilometres (38 mi) south-east of Katanning in the Great Southern region of Western Australia.

== Etymology ==
Gnowangerup is named as the place of the mallee fowl in the Aboriginal Noongar language, being derived from nearby Gnowangerup Creek and Spring, both names being first recorded in 1878. The name means "place where the mallee hen (gnow) nests".

The town was first gazetted under the spelling of Ngowangerupp. Local dissatisfaction with this spelling led to it being altered to Gnowangerup in 1913.

== History ==
The traditional owners of the area are the Goreng people of the Noongar nation, who lived on the plains in the area for thousands of years prior to the arrival of European settlers.

The townsite was first gazetted in 1908.

Following a severe drought the town was flooded in 1940 after a torrential downpour. The bridge was covered by water, parts of the railway line, the local tennis courts and pavilion were washed away.

== Education ==
Gnowangerup State School was opened in November 1908 on a site on the northern edge of town. It is now known as Gnowangerup District High School and caters for students from Kindergarten to Year 10.

== Facilities ==
The local Agricultural Hall was opened on 20 July 1910 by Arnold Piesse, MLA for the Katanning electorate.

The Ongerup branch railway from Tambellup was open for service to Gnowangerup on 1 July 1912. It was extended to Ongerup on 6 January 1913. Train services east of Gnowangerup ceased on 13 October 1957.

The War Memorial Hall was opened in 1923, the same year that electric light was being installed. The population of the town in the same year was 1,350 people.

A United Aborigines Mission, Gnowangerup Mission, was established on Muir Hill in 1935 on a 61-hectare (151-acre) site to replace the mission run on the Government reserve that ran from 1926 until 1935. The mission ceased operations in 1954 and then reopened as the Agricultural High School for Indigenous Australian boys.

In 1972 the Gnowangerup Noongar Centre was established by the New Era Aboriginal Fellowship operating out of a 1913 former bishop's residence that was also the headquarters of the Gnowangerup Noongar Corporation until 1989. The building was placed on the State Heritage Register. in 2012

== Industry ==
The area was being used for cereal cropping and grazing livestock, particularly sheep. The areas around the town were running a flock of around 204,296 sheep in 1917.

The town also consists of a small industrial area where there are many different businesses to support the district's farms.

The surrounding areas produce wheat and other cereal crops. The town is a receival site for Cooperative Bulk Handling.

== Media ==
The Gnowangerup Star (1942–2003), also published as the Gnowangerup Star and Tambellup Ongerup Gazette (1915–1942), was a weekly English language newspaper published in Gnowangerup.
