= List of lakes of Western Australia, D–K =

This list includes all lakes, both intermittent and perennial. It is complete with respect to the 1996 Gazetteer of Australia. Dubious names have been checked against the online 2004 data, and in all cases confirmed correct. However, if any lakes have been gazetted or deleted since 1996, this list does not reflect these changes. Strictly speaking, Australian place names are gazetted in capital letters only; the names in this list have been converted to mixed case in accordance with normal capitalisation conventions. Locations are as gazetted; some lakes may extend over large areas.

== D ==
Name	Coordinates	Remarks
Lake Dalaroo	30°37′S 115°57′E	
Dalona Billabong	16°44′S 125°23′E	
Daringdella Lake	33°39′S 123°49′E	
Lake Darlot	27°47′S 121°35′E	
Lake Davies	34°13′S 115°2′E	
Lake Deborah East	30°40′S 119°26′E	
Lake Deborah West	30°48′S 119°4′E	
Lake Dennis	20°54′S 128°56′E	
Doggerup Lake	34°48′S 116°4′E	
Lake Doherty	16°31′S 125°15′E	
Lake Doman	19°43′S 126°48′E	
Lake Don	34°43′S 117°41′E	
Doombup Lake	33°49′S 122°3′E	
Lake Dora	22°4′S 122°57′E	
Dornducking Lake	33°19′S 117°27′E	
Lake Dorathy	33°29′S 118°28′E	
Lake Dowerin	31°15′S 117°3′E	
Duck Hole	18°25′S 125°31′E	
Duck Hole Billabong	18°36′S 124°42′E	
Duck Lake	35°0′S 117°52′E	
Dulbining Lake	32°54′S 117°37′E	
Dumbleyung Lake	33°21′S 117°40′E	
Lake Dundas	32°29′S 121°50′E	

== E ==
Name	Coordinates	Remarks
Eclipse Lake	32°57′S 118°50′E	
Lake Eda	17°53′S 122°39′E	
Lake Edith Withnell	25°35′S 120°41′E	
Lake Eganu	30°0′S 115°52′E	
Lake Eleanor	30°46′S 116°36′E	
Ellen, Loch	34°26′S 117°34′E	
Emu Lake	28°28′S 117°55′E	
Lake Emu	30°9′S 121°50′E	
Lake Emu	28°28′S 117°55′E	
Eva Broadhurst Lake	22°13′S 122°56′E	
Ewans Lake	33°48′S 121°58′E	
Lake Ewlyamartup	33°42′S 117°44′E	
Exclamation Lake	32°45′S 121°26′E	
Lake Eyrie	34°46′S 117°58′E	

== F ==
Name	Coordinates	Remarks
Farewell Lakes	21°14′S 127°8′E	
First Yarp	16°52′S 122°58′E	
Flagstaff Lake	33°31′S 117°16′E	
Lake Fleay	33°11′S 119°4′E	
Lake Flora	16°59′S 123°2′E	
Lake Florence	34°44′S 116°6′E	
Forrestdale Lake	32°9′S 115°56′E	
Fossil Billabong	18°14′S 125°55′E	
Lake Fox	32°52′S 119°30′E	
Fraser Lake	18°2′S 122°42′E	

== G ==
Name	Coordinates	Remarks
Galup	31°56′S 115°50′E	formerly Lake Monger, renamed in 2025
Garagan Lake	31°4′S 115°28′E	
Garden Lake	32°0′S 115°32′E	
Gardner Lake	34°58′S 118°9′E	
Geelanding Lakes	29°20′S 118°2′E	
Lake George	22°38′S 123°38′E	
Gidgi Lakes	29°3′S 126°1′E	
Lake Gidong	33°47′S 121°29′E	
Lake Gilbert	16°34′S 125°16′E	
Lake Gillen	26°13′S 124°36′E	
Lake Gilmore	32°37′S 121°37′E	
Gladstone Lake	17°11′S 126°14′E	
Gnangara Lake	31°47′S 115°52′E	
Gobba Lake	31°56′S 115°56′E	
Goegrup Lake	32°31′S 115°47′E	
Lake Goollelal	31°49′S 115°49′E	
Goose Hole Billabong	18°32′S 124°41′E	
Gooseneck Billabong	15°38′S 128°54′E	
Lake Gore	33°46′S 121°31′E	
Lake Gounter	32°24′S 118°50′E	
Government House Lake	32°0′S 115°32′E	
Lake Grace North	33°10′S 118°21′E	part of the Lake Grace wetland system
Lake Grace South	33°17′S 118°24′E	part of the Lake Grace wetland system
Gravity Lakes	20°52′S 126°5′E	
Green Lake	29°56′S 115°7′E	
Lake Gregory (Kimberley)	20°12′S 127°27′E	known as Paraku in the Walmajarri language
Lake Gregory (Mid West)	25°35′S 119°56′E	
Lake Gruszka	25°19′S 125°34′E	
Guli Lake	21°18′S 125°54′E	
Gull Rock Lake	35°0′S 118°0′E	
Lake Gulson	32°47′S 119°25′E	
Gum Hole Billabong	18°55′S 125°32′E	
Gum Hole Billabong	18°46′S 124°51′E	
Gundaring Lake	33°18′S 117°29′E	
Lake Guraga	30°52′S 115°34′E	
Lake Gwelup	31°53′S 115°47′E	
Gwenneth Lakes	20°57′S 124°35′E	
Lake Gwynne	30°34′S 121°39′E	

== H ==
Name	Coordinates	Remarks
Hagboom Lake	31°25′S 116°58′E	
Lake Halbert	33°17′S 122°12′E	
Hamersley Lakes	30°25′S 118°56′E	
Hannan Lake	30°50′S 121°32′E	
Harms Lake	32°14′S 123°4′E	
Harper Lagoon	30°32′S 121°34′E	
Harris Lake	31°16′S 123°34′E	
Lake Hayward	32°53′S 115°41′E	
Lake Hazlett	21°27′S 128°35′E	
Heart Echo Lake	33°27′S 121°37′E	
Helms Lakes	29°5′S 125°51′E	
Herdsman Lake	31°55′S 115°48′E	
Herridges Lake	31°24′S 116°40′E	
Herschel Lake	32°0′S 115°32′E	
Lake Hill	33°7′S 119°6′E	
Lake Hillier	34°6′S 123°12′E	
Hilliup Lake	34°21′S 118°52′E	
Lake Hinds	30°47′S 116°34′E	
Lake Hope	32°28′S 120°29′E	
Horan Lake	29°0′S 121°24′E	
Horse Shoe Lake	34°14′S 117°43′E	
Hunters Lake	31°8′S 116°51′E	
Lake Hurlstone	32°36′S 119°24′E	

== I ==
Name	Coordinates	Remarks
Ibis Lake	32°59′S 117°32′E	
Lake Indoon	29°52′S 115°9′E	
Inga Lake	28°59′S 115°35′E	
Ingra Lake	30°41′S 115°46′E	
Lake Irwin	28°1′S 121°38′E	
Lake Isabella	20°34′S 127°12′E	

== J ==
Name	Coordinates	Remarks
Jackadder Lake	31°54′S 115°48′E	
Jandabup Lake	31°44′S 115°50′E	
Lake Janet	33°21′S 118°48′E	
Lake Jasper	34°25′S 115°41′E	
Jaugle Lake	17°11′S 123°6′E	
Lake Jeavons	20°38′S 128°55′E	
Jebarjup Swan Lake	34°17′S 117°50′E	
Lake Jeffries	26°37′S 122°4′E	
Jerdacuttup Lakes	33°55′S 120°17′E	
Jilakin Lake	32°40′S 118°21′E	
Jogalong Billabong	15°36′S 128°16′E	
Lake Johnston	32°9′S 120°45′E	
Jolimont Lake	31°57′S 115°48′E	
Lake Jones	19°28′S 126°6′E	
Lake Joondalup	31°46′S 115°47′E	
Lake Josceline	18°6′S 124°24′E	
Lake Josephine	33°6′S 115°42′E	
Lake Joy	33°36′S 118°31′E	
Jualbup Lake	31°57′S 115°48′E	formerly known as "Shenton Park Lake"

== K ==
Name	Coordinates	Remarks
Lake Kabbamup	32°53′S 116°2′E	
Lake Kadgo	26°41′S 127°18′E	
Kaimerndyip Lake	34°35′S 117°49′E	
Karakin Lakes	31°4′S 115°29′E	
Lake Karri Karri	25°36′S 120°44′E	
Lake Karrinyup	31°52′S 115°47′E	
Lake Katherine	34°29′S 117°22′E	
Lake Kathleen	32°59′S 119°41′E	
Kepalarup Lake	34°15′S 116°24′E	
Lake Kerrylyn	25°2′S 120°43′E	
Lake King	33°7′S 119°37′E	
Lake King	25°36′S 120°4′E	
Lake Kirk	32°17′S 121°44′E	
Kogolup Lake	32°8′S 115°50′E	
Kokokup Lake	34°42′S 117°40′E	
Kondinin Lake	32°29′S 118°13′E	
Kooljarloo Lake	30°33′S 115°41′E	
Lake Koombekine	31°5′S 116°59′E	
Lake Koorkoordine	31°11′S 119°19′E	
Lake Kubitch	33°47′S 121°30′E	
Kulunilup Lake	34°20′S 116°47′E	
Kumpupintil Lake	23°30′S 112°50′E	
Lake Kununurra	15°49′S 128°44′E	
Kurranging Lake	30°17′S 117°25′E	
Lake Kurrenkutten	32°16′S 118°4′E	
Kwornicup Lake	34°33′S 117°25′E	

== See also ==
- List of lakes in Western Australia
