= List of heritage places in the Shire of Kent =

List of heritage sites in Western Australia

The State Register of Heritage Places is maintained by the Heritage Council of Western Australia. As of 2026, 71 places are heritage-listed in the Shire of Kent, of which none are on the State Register of Heritage Places.

== List ==
As of 2026, following places are heritage listed in the Shire of Kent:

Place name	Place #	Street name	Suburb or town	Notes & former names	Photo
Nyabing Honour Roll	1016		Nyabing		
Road Board Hall	1385	Richmond Street	Nyabing	Agricultural Hall, Road Board Office, Shire Hall	
School (Second)	1386	Bourke	Nyabing	Brownie Hut	
Nyabing Hotel	1387	Richmond Street	Nyabing	Boarding House	
R.S.L. HALL	1388	Richmond Street	Nyabing		
Cooperative Bulk Handling Grain Store	1389	Sanderson Street	Pingrup	Old Wheat Silo, Cooperative Bulk Handling Grain Store	
General Store and Petrol Stop	1390	Sanderson Street	Pingrup		
Public Library	1391	Sanderson Street	Pingrup	Old North School, The East School	
Agricultural Society Hall	3931	Martin Street	Nyabing	Exhibition Hall	
Rabbit Proof Fence No 2 and No 3	5022		Northampton to Ravensthorpe	Emu Barrier Fence	
Titicup Road Dam No 226	10240	Titicup Road	Pingrup		
Quartermaines Dam No 212	10706	Nyabing Road South Corner Manuel Road	Nyabing		
Hollands Dam No 224	11572	Nyabing-Pingrup Road	Nyabing		
Chinocup Road Dam No 225	11618	Chinocup Road	Nyabing		
Pingrup Dam No 415	12025		Pingrup		
Pingrup Dam No 545	12030		Pingrup		
Holland's Track	16818		Multiple LGAs		
All Saints Community Church	17722	Aspendale Street	Nyabing		
Bulk Handling Grain Bin	17723	Richmond Street	Nyabing		
CWA House	17724	Richmond Street	Nyabing		
Cemetery (1928) and Gateway	17725	Nyabing South Road	Nyabing		
Drinking Fountain	17726	Richmond Street	Nyabing		
Football Changing Shed	17727	Martin Street	Nyabing		
General Store (Gannaway's)	17728	Richmond Street	Nyabing	Richardson and Co., Sanderson's General Store	
Golf Course and Club House	17729	Bin Road	Nyabing	Shire Depot	
Grader Monument	17730	Richmond Street	Nyabing		
Monument and Plaques	17731	Richmond Street	Nyabing		
Nampup Soak	17732	Off Bin Road	Nyabing	Nyabing Soak	
Railway Station Site	17733	Richmond Street	Nyabing	part of the former Katanning to Pingrup railway line	
Road Board Secretary's House	17734	Richmond Street	Nyabing		
Rock Formation	17735	Nyabing/Pingrup Road	Nyabing		
Salmon Gum Tree	17736	Richmond Street	Nyabing	Tree	
School (first)	17737	Bourke Street	Nyabing	Depot Building	
School - Nyabing Primary	17738	Hobley Street	Nyabing		
School House	17739	Richmond Street	Nyabing		
Telephone Tower	17740	Richmond Street	Nyabing		
Tuffley's Iron Shed	17741	Richmond Street	Nyabing		
War Memorial and Garden	17742	Aspendale Street	Nyabing		
Water Tanks	17743	Richmond Street	Nyabing		
Boarding House Site	17744	Sanderson Street	Pingrup		
Carrie Graves	17745	Carrie Farm	Pingrup		
Cemetery Gateway and Seat	17746	Sanderson Street	Pingrup		
Community Church	17747	Sanderson Street	Pingrup		
Farm Stock and Agency Shop (a)	17748	Sanderson Street	Pingrup		
Farm Stock and Agency Shop (b)	17749	Sanderson Street	Pingrup		
Garage (First) (a)	17750	Paterson Street	Pingrup	Roadhouse	
Garage (First) (b)	17751	Paterson Street	Pingrup	Roadhouse	
General Store and Post Office	17752	Sanderson Street	Pingrup	Pingrup Traders	
Pingrup Hall	17753	Sanderson Street	Pingrup		
Holland Rocks	17754		Pingrup		
Holland's Track, Pingrup	17755	Pingrup Road	Pingrup		
Hotel Pingrup	17756	Paterson Street	Pingrup	Shearers' Board and Boarding House	
Iron Shed/Garage	17757	Altham Street	Pingrup	Trezane Bulldozers	
Lion's Park and Water Pipe Monument	17758	Sanderson Street	Pingrup		
Pottery Shed	17759	Patterson Street	Pingrup		
Primary School and Wishing Well	17760	Carrie Street	Pingrup		
Railway Station and Terminus Site	17761	Sanderson Street	Pingrup	part of the former Katanning to Pingrup railway line	
Sale Yards	17762		Pingrup		
Shearers' Monument	17763	Sanderson Street	Pingrup		
Tennis Court Site	17764	Paterson Street	Pingrup		
War Memorial	17765	Sanderson Street	Pingrup		
Water Tower	17766	Paterson Street	Pingrup		
Chinocup Siding (Site)	17767		Chinocup	part of the former Katanning to Pingrup railway line	
Dams - Recreation Ground	17768	Martin Street	Nyabing		
Recreation Ground and Centre	17769	Martin Street	Nyabing		
Rifle Range Site	17770	Kuringup Road	Nyabing		
Dam - Town Dam	17778	Pingrup Road	Nyabing		
Dam (First)	17779	Paterson Road	Pingrup		
Dam (Second)	17780	Recreation Road	Pingrup		
Dam	17781	Holmes Road	Pingrup		
Old Roads Board Office	18708	Martin Street	Nyabing		
