= Chinocup =

Chinocup may refer to:

- Chinocup, Western Australia, a townsite in the Shire of Kent
- Chinocup Dam Nature Reserve, a nature reserve in Western Australia
- Chinocup Nature Reserve, a nature reserve in Western Australia
  - Lake Chinocup, a lake within the above nature reserve
- Acacia leptalea, commonly known as the Chinocup wattle
