= Lake Grace (disambiguation) =

Lake Grace is a loosely defined geographic area of Western Australia. Specific places include:

- Lake Grace, Western Australia, a town
- Shire of Lake Grace, a local government area
- Lake Grace North, a lake
- Lake Grace South, a lake
- Lake Grace System, a wetland
