= List of lakes of Western Australia, A–C =

This list includes all lakes, both intermittent and perennial. It is complete with respect to the 1996 Gazetteer of Australia. Dubious names have been checked against the online 2004 data, and in all cases confirmed correct. However, if any lakes have been gazetted or deleted since 1996, this list does not reflect these changes. Strictly speaking, Australian place names are gazetted in capital letters only; the names in this list have been converted to mixed case in accordance with normal capitalisation conventions. Locations are as gazetted; some lakes may extend over large areas.

== 0-9 ==
Name	Coordinates	Remarks
10 Mile Lake	24°47′S 120°19′E	
13 Mile Billabong	19°22′S 127°43′E	
16 Mile Billabong	15°34′S 128°15′E	
2 Mile Lake	34°30′S 118°16′E	
7 Mile Billabong	18°33′S 125°14′E	
8 Mile Billabong	15°54′S 128°34′E	
9 Mile Lake	32°44′S 115°47′E	

== A ==
Name	Coordinates	Remarks
Abbotts Lake	31°25′S 116°40′E	
Lake Ace	33°0′S 119°46′E	
Lake Adams	31°42′S 115°49′E	
Lake Aerodrome	24°39′S 121°49′E	
Lake Alice	17°38′S 123°37′E	
Lake Alma	17°51′S 123°39′E	
Lake Altham	33°24′S 118°26′E	technically a wetland
Lake Amarillo	32°26′S 115°49′E	
Anderson Lake	34°11′S 117°58′E	
Lake Anec	23°58′S 128°3′E	
Angove Lake	34°57′S 118°10′E	
Lake Anneen	26°56′S 118°19′E	
Ardath Lakes	32°7′S 118°9′E	
Lake Argyle	16°11′S 128°54′E	technically a man-made reservoir
Arramall Lakes	29°30′S 115°3′E	
Arro Lake	29°45′S 115°10′E	
Arrow Lake	30°32′S 121°25′E	
Arrowsmith Lake	29°33′S 115°5′E	
Lake Augusta	25°46′S 122°29′E	
Lake Auld	22°15′S 123°47′E	
Lake Austin	27°37′S 117°55′E	
Lake Austral	33°0′S 118°53′E	

== B ==
Name	Coordinates	Remarks
Badgerup Lake	31°47′S 115°50′E	
Lake Baghdad	32°0′S 115°31′E	
Baker Lake	26°49′S 126°4′E	
Baladjie Lake	30°56′S 118°58′E	
Balannup Lake	32°7′S 115°57′E	
Balicup Lake	34°16′S 117°47′E	
Lake Ballard	29°27′S 120°50′E	
Lake Ballingall	33°14′S 116°8′E	
Lake Balmanup	32°12′S 115°51′E	
Balpe Lakes	29°15′S 123°20′E	
Lake Bambun	31°25′30″S 115°53′24″E	
Banganup Lake	32°10′S 115°50′E	
Banjup Lake	32°10′S 115°53′E	
Lake Banksiadale	32°39′S 116°4′E	technically a man-made reservoir
Bannister Lakes	32°3′S 115°55′E	
Bannitup Lake	33°50′S 122°4′E	
Barbwire Lake	26°21′S 115°40′E	
Barker Lake	31°48′S 120°4′E	
Lake Barlee	29°5′S 119°28′E	
Lake Barnes	34°44′S 117°39′E	
Barragoon Lake	31°22′S 115°39′E	
Baylemup Lake	33°47′S 121°42′E	
Lake Bedford	26°4′S 123°9′E	
Bedracoine Lake	26°14′S 115°42′E	
Beermullah Lake	31°12′S 115°47′E	
Lake Belah	33°28′S 119°21′E	
Benje Benjenup Lake	33°42′S 121°54′E	
Lake Beridup	33°27′S 115°39′E	
Lake Betty	19°31′S 126°20′E	
Beyondie Lakes	24°45′S 120°16′E	
Bibra Lake	32°6′S 115°49′E	
Lake Biddy	33°1′S 118°56′E	
Big Lake	33°16′S 118°22′E	
Billy Lake	32°59′S 117°32′E	
Lake Bindi	30°37′S 116°20′E	
Bindiar Lake	31°27′S 115°45′E	
Black Lake	32°32′S 115°48′E	
Lake Blair	24°43′S 125°35′E	
Lake Blakers	19°21′S 126°22′E	
Lake Blanche	22°27′S 123°10′E	
Blue Lake	34°46′S 117°16′E	
Boggy Lake (Great Southern)	34°28′24″S 117°08′59″E	
Boggy Lake (South West)	34°2′02″S 116°39′44″E	
Bokan Lake	33°0′S 117°31′E	
Bolghinup Lake	34°25′S 115°33′E	
Bookara Lake	29°3′S 114°54′E	
Boolenup Lake	33°51′S 122°59′E	
Boonalarup Lake	31°18′S 115°49′E	
Lake Boonderoo	31°10′S 124°21′E	
Booragoon Lake	32°3′S 115°50′E	
Boorokup Lakes	34°13′S 117°32′E	
Boronia Lake	34°40′S 117°5′E	
Boulder Lake	33°36′S 115°31′E	
Boundary Lake	32°46′S 115°38′E	
Lake Brazier	32°8′S 121°52′E	
Lake Breaden	25°48′S 125°37′E	
Breberle Lake	26°20′S 115°58′E	
The Broadwater	33°41′S 115°18′E	
Lake Brockman	33°0′S 115°58′E	technically a man-made reservoir
Brown Lagoon	30°27′S 120°59′E	
Brown Lake	30°56′S 121°18′E	
Lake Brown	29°14′S 126°0′E	
Lake Brown	31°6′S 118°17′E	
Lake Bryde	33°21′S 118°49′E	
Lake Buchan	33°8′S 119°4′E	
Lake Buggan	25°44′S 122°48′E	
Bukenerup Lake	33°48′S 121°50′E	
Bulganyah Lake	20°19′S 119°15′E	
Bunning Lake	31°57′S 115°51′E	
Lake Burkett	33°6′S 119°2′E	
Lake Burnacoora	26°58′S 118°32′E	
Burra Lake	28°48′S 116°19′E	
Burrillgabby Lake	29°3′S 116°20′E	
Butlers Lake	17°17′S 123°54′E	

== C ==
Name	Coordinates	Remarks
Lake Caesar	26°31′S 115°42′E	
Lake Cairlocup	33°44′S 118°45′E	
Lake Caitup	33°44′S 121°44′E	
Caladenia Lake	31°13′S 115°38′E	
Camel Lake	34°17′S 117°58′E	
Lake Campion	17°51′S 122°45′E	
Carabooda Lake	31°37′S 115°43′E	
Lake Carabundup	34°28′S 117°18′E	
Lake Carbul	33°46′S 121°30′E	
Lake Carey	28°57′S 122°17′E	
Carinup Lakes	33°22′S 118°28′E	
Carnaging Lake	28°12′S 116°11′E	
Lake Carnegie	26°10′S 122°24′E	
Lake Cassencarry	33°52′S 118°29′E	
Lake Catambro	31°30′S 115°56′E	
Cattaminnup Lake	34°29′S 116°24′E	
Chandler Lake	31°6′S 118°26′E	
Lake Charling	33°31′S 117°11′E	
Cheepanup Lake	34°11′S 117°55′E	
Cheetup Lake	33°52′S 122°29′E	
Lake Chidnup	33°22′S 119°53′E	
Chincocup Lake	33°30′S 118°26′E	
Lake Chinocup	33°30′S 118°26′E	
Lake Chittering	31°26′S 116°5′E	
Lake Cigalere	31°43′S 127°14′E	
Lake Clabburn	34°9′S 116°49′E	
Lake Claremont	31°58′S 115°46′E	
Clarkes Lake	31°24′S 116°36′E	
Clear Lake	33°44′S 117°8′E	
Lake Clifton	32°47′S 115°40′E	
Lake Cobham	33°27′S 119°17′E	
Lake Cobinup	33°48′S 121°10′E	
Codarup Lake	34°17′S 116°24′E	
Lake Cohen	24°27′S 125°2′E	
Lake Colville	29°30′S 126°40′E	
Con Lake	29°14′S 122°22′E	
Condingup Lake	33°45′S 122°33′E	
Lake Coogee	32°8′S 115°46′E	
Coolilup Lakes	33°36′S 115°31′E	
Lake Cooloongup	32°18′S 115°47′E	
Coomberianyah Lake	20°21′S 119°23′E	
Coomelberrup Lake	33°24′S 117°47′E	
Coorie Billabong	18°14′S 125°36′E	
Coppino Lake	31°22′S 115°39′E	
Copulup Lake	32°9′S 115°50′E	
Lake Corimup	34°46′S 118°8′E	
Lake Cowan	31°42′S 121°54′E	
Coyrecup Lake	33°42′S 117°50′E	
Lake Crawford	34°28′S 117°16′E	
Lake Cronin	32°23′S 119°46′E	
Crystal Lake	33°10′S 122°9′E	
Crystal Lake	35°2′S 116°39′E	
Cudoralcarra Lake	30°38′S 115°58′E	
Culcadarra Lake	31°17′S 115°43′E	
Lake Culcurdoo	27°25′S 114°8′E	

== See also ==
- Geography of Western Australia
- List of lakes of Australia
- List of lakes in Western Australia
