= Fraser Lake (disambiguation) =

Fraser Lake may refer to:

- Fraser Lake (Nautley River), lake in northern British Columbia, Canada, a source of the Nautley River
  - Fraser Lake, British Columbia, a village in northern British Columbia, Canada
- Fraser Lake (Minnesota), lake in Lake County, in the U.S. state of Minnesota
- Fraser Lake (Western Australia), lake in the Australian state of Western Australia
