= Moornaming =

Town in the Shire of Kent, Western Australia

- Town
- Interactive map of Moornaming
- Coordinates: 33°34′0″S 118°50′0″E
- Country: Australia
- State: Western Australia
- LGA: Shire of Kent
- Location: 275 km (171 mi) SW of Perth; 163 km (101 mi) N of Albany; 51 km (32 mi) E of Katanning
- Established: 1912

Government
  - State electorate: Roe
  - Federal division: O'Connor

Area
  - Total: 1.13 km^{2} (0.44 sq mi)
- Postcode: 6341
- Gazetted: 1915

Moornaming is an abandoned townsite in the locality of Nyabing, Shire of Kent, in the Great Southern region of Western Australia. Much of the gazetted area of the former townsite is now covered by the Moornaming Nature Reserve.

Moornaming and the Shire of Kent are located on the traditional land of the Koreng people of the Noongar nation.

Moornaming was a stop on the Katanning to Pingrup railway line, just west of the No. 2 Rabbit-proof fence, originally named Shannons, after a nearby soak. In 1912, it was renamed to Badgeminnup, the indigenous name for the area, and a townsite established. When the townsite was gazetted in 1915, the spelling was slightly altered to Badjeminnup. In 1923, the town's name was changed again, now to Moornaming, as the previous one led to confusion with Badgebup.

== Nature reserve ==
The Moornaming Nature Reserve was gazetted on 2 December 1983, has a size of 0.78 square kilometres (0.30 mi^{2}), and is located within the Mallee bioregion.
