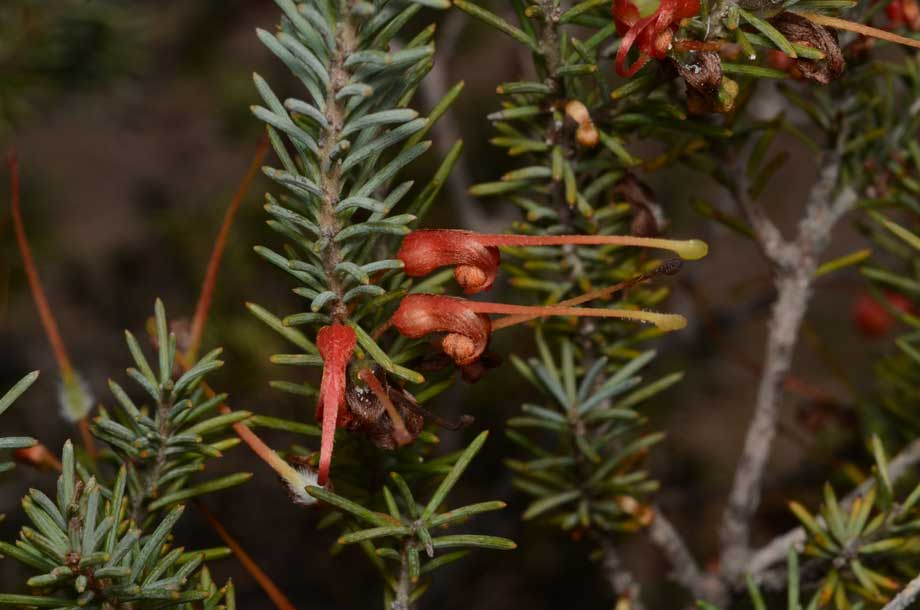

Conservation status
- Least Concern (IUCN 3.1)

Scientific classification
- Kingdom: Plantae
- Clade: Embryophytes
- Clade: Tracheophytes
- Clade: Spermatophytes
- Clade: Angiosperms
- Clade: Eudicots
- Order: Proteales
- Family: Proteaceae
- Genus: Grevillea
- Species: G. disjuncta

Binomial name
- Grevillea disjuncta F.Muell.

= Grevillea disjuncta =

Species of shrub native to Western Australia

Grevillea disjuncta is a species of flowering plant in the family Proteaceae and is endemic to the south-west of Western Australia. It is low, mounded or spreading shrub with linear to more or less needle-shaped leaves and small groups of pale orange to bright red and green or yellow flowers.

== Description ==
Grevillea disjuncta is a low, mounded or spreading shrub that typically grows to a height of 0.3–1 m (1 ft 0 in – 3 ft 3 in). Its leaves are linear to more or less needle-shaped, 8–20 mm (0.31–0.79 in) long and 1–3 mm (0.039–0.118 in) wide, the upper surface ridged and the edges rolled under, obscuring the lower surface. The flowers are arranged in leaf axils and along the stems in spreading groups of usually up to four. The flowers are pale orange to bright red and green to yellow, the pistil 19.5–28 mm (0.77–1.10 in) long. Flowering occurs from April to September and the fruit is an oval follicle 9.5–14 mm (0.37–0.55 in) long with a few shaggy hairs.

== Taxonomy ==
Grevillea disjuncta was first formally described in 1868 by Ferdinand von Mueller in Fragmenta Phytographiae Australiae. The specific epithet (disjuncta) means "separated", referring to the small groups of flowers.

== Distribution and habitat ==
This grevillea grows in heath, shrubland and woodland mainly in the area between Dumbleyung, Nyabing and Pingrup in the Avon Wheatbelt, Esperance Plains and Mallee biogeographic regions of south-western Western Australia.

== Conservation status ==
Grevillea disjuncta is listed as least concern on the IUCN Red List of Threatened Species and not threatened by the Government of Western Australia Department of Biodiversity, Conservation and Attractions. It has a wide distribution and its population is believed to be largely stable. There are currently no known major threats to this species, either at present or in the near future.

== See also ==
- List of Grevillea species
