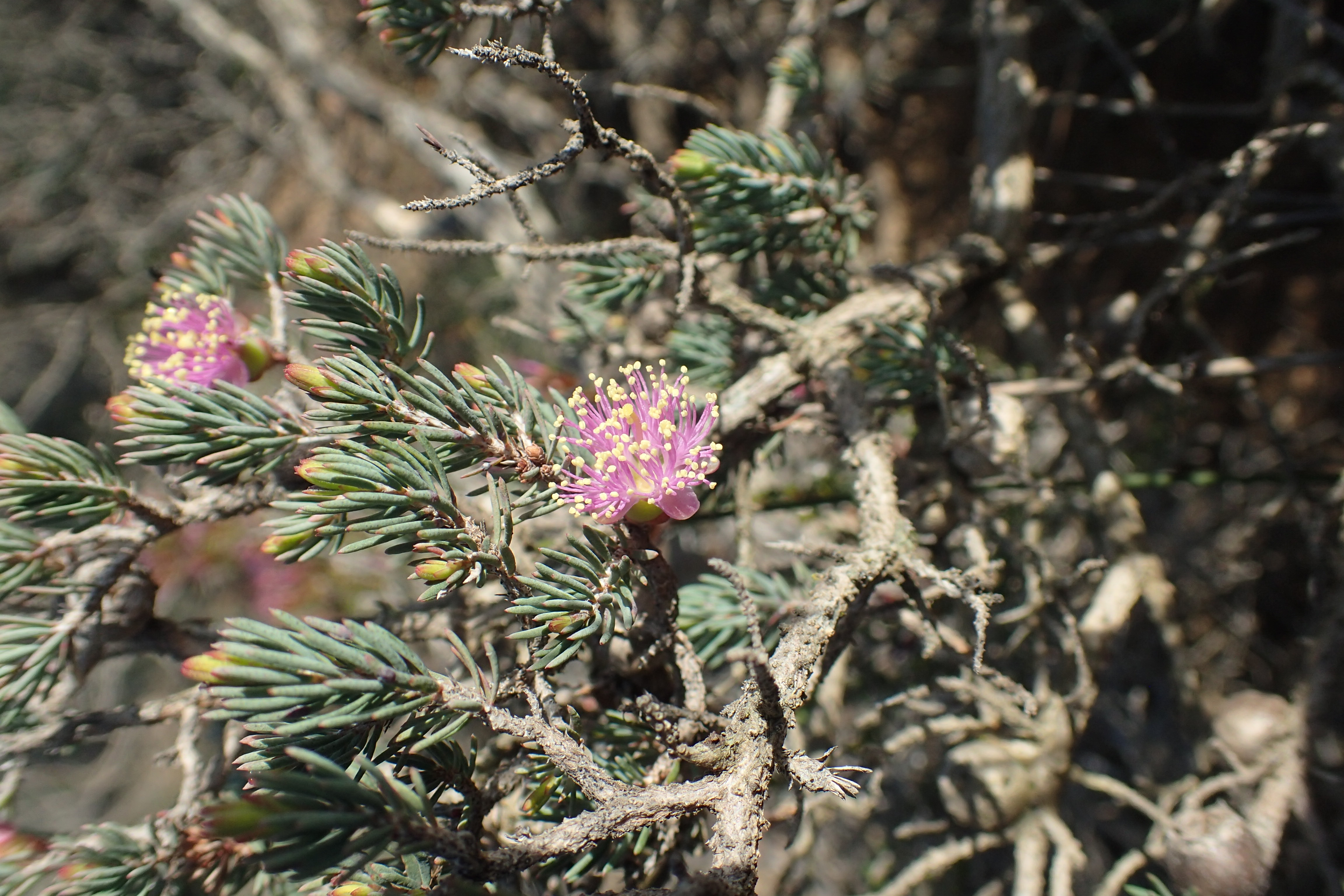

Scientific classification
- Kingdom: Plantae
- Clade: Tracheophytes
- Clade: Angiosperms
- Clade: Eudicots
- Clade: Rosids
- Order: Myrtales
- Family: Myrtaceae
- Genus: Melaleuca
- Species: M. lecanantha

Binomial name
- Melaleuca lecanantha Barlow

Synonyms
- Melaleuca conferta Benth.; Myrtoleucodendron confertum Kuntze

= Melaleuca lecanantha =

Species of shrub

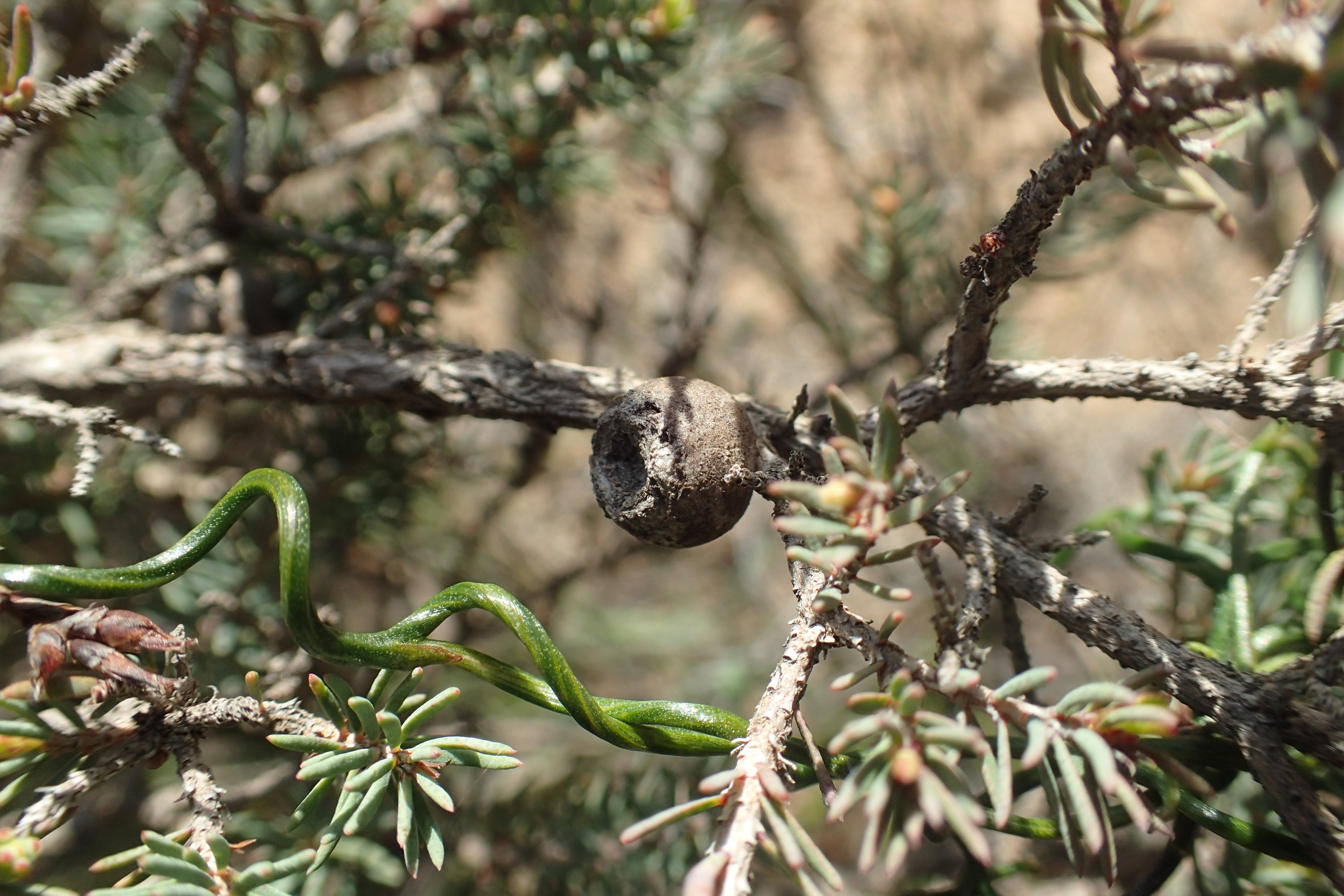
Fruit

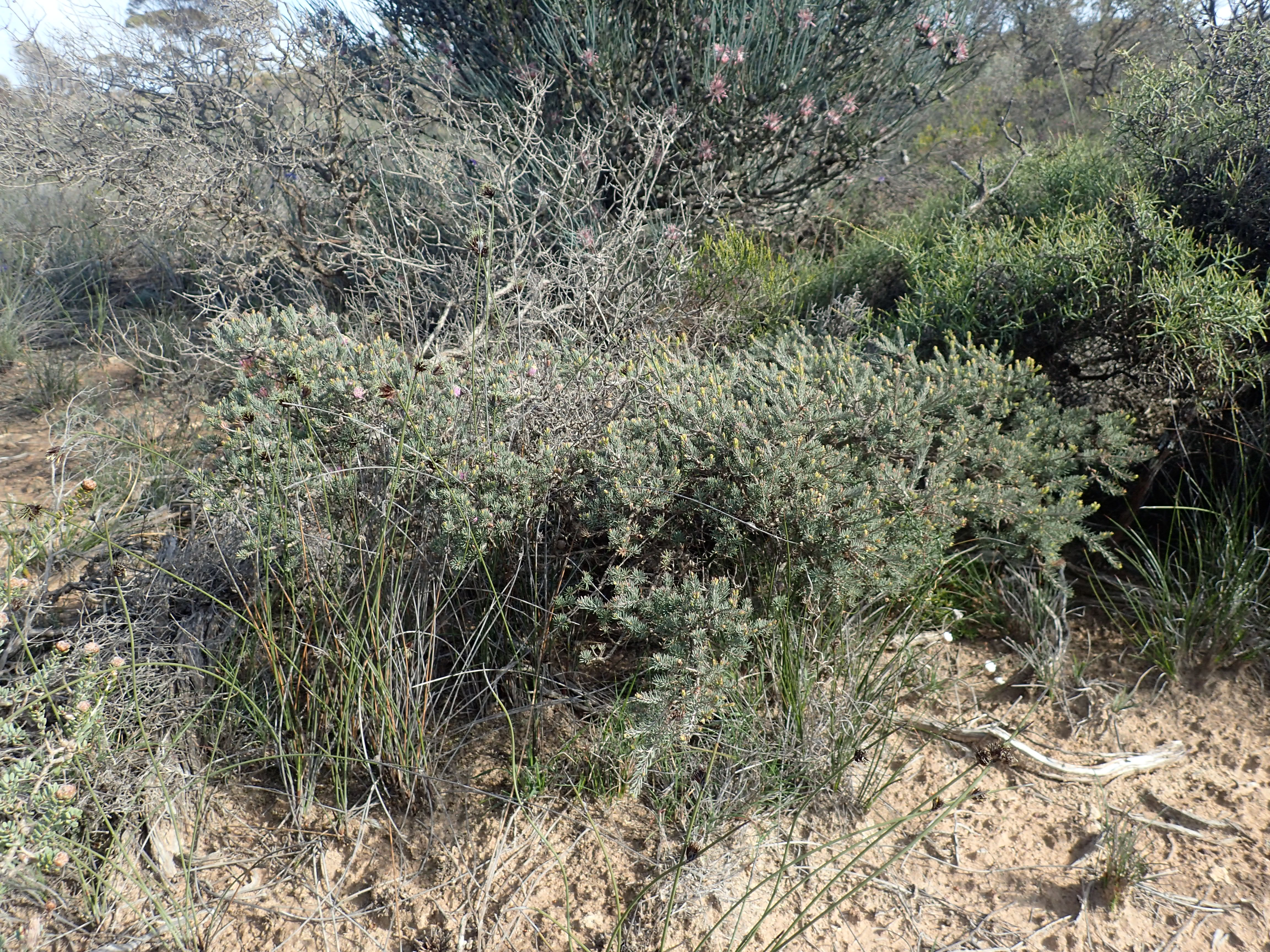
Habit about 20km east of Lake Grace

Melaleuca lecanantha is a plant in the myrtle family, Myrtaceae and is endemic to a small area of south-west Western Australia. It is a shrub with small, rather fleshy leaves and pink to lilac-coloured flowers in early spring. The plant was first described in 1867 but the name given to it was considered illegitimate and it was not until 1998 that it was first formally described.

== Description ==
Melaleuca lecanantha is an erect shrub, 0.2–2 m (0.7–7 ft) tall with mostly glabrous branchlets and leaves. The leaves are tiny - 3.7–7.5 mm (0.1–0.3 in) long and only 0.5–0.7 mm (0.02–0.03 in) wide, linear, almost circular in cross-section and with almost no stalk.

The flowers occur singly (rarely in pairs) along the stem and are pink or lilac-mauve. The stamens are arranged in five bundles around the flowers and there are 19-30 stamens per bundle - an unusually large number for the genus. The base of the flower (the hypanthium) is glabrous and 2.5–3.5 mm (0.098–0.14 in) long. September to October is the main flowering period and the fruit are woody capsules, 5–6 mm (0.20–0.24 in) long.

== Taxonomy and naming ==
The species had been described in 1867 by George Bentham in Flora Australiensis as Melaleuca conferta but the name was illegitimate. The new species was described in 1988 by Bryan Barlow in Nuytsia to accommodate the plants known by the illegitimate name. According to Barlow, the specific epithet (lecanantha) means "dish-flowered", referring to the dish-like shape formed by the stamens.

== Distribution and habitat ==
Melaleuca lecanantha is confined to the area between Wongan Hills, Southern Cross, Lake King and Nyabing in the Avon Wheatbelt and Mallee biogeographic regions. It grows in grey or yellow sand with gravel and sandy clay.

== Conservation status ==
Melaleuca lecanantha is listed as not threatened by the Government of Western Australia Department of Parks and Wildlife.
