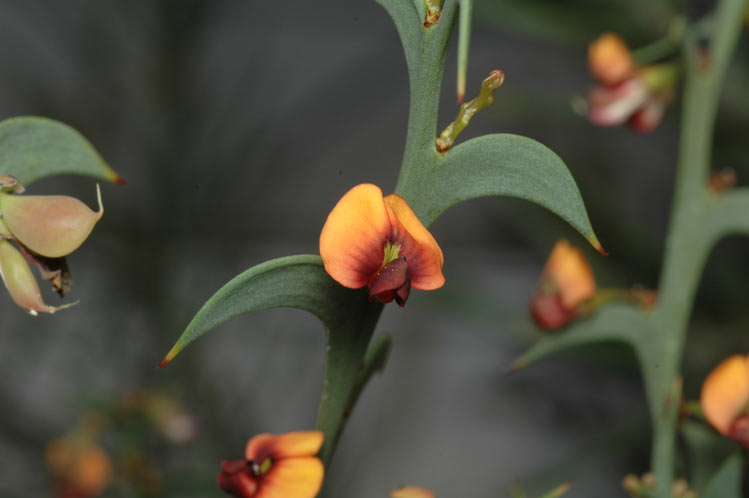
- In the Australian National Botanic Gardens

Scientific classification
- Kingdom: Plantae
- Clade: Tracheophytes
- Clade: Angiosperms
- Clade: Eudicots
- Clade: Rosids
- Order: Fabales
- Family: Fabaceae
- Subfamily: Faboideae
- Genus: Daviesia
- Species: D. dilatata

Binomial name
- Daviesia dilatata Crisp

= Daviesia dilatata =

Species of flowering plant

Daviesia dilatata is a species of flowering plant in the family Fabaceae and is endemic to the south-west of Western Australia. It is an erect, open, glabrous shrub with scattered, often sickle-shaped phyllodes, and orange, red, yellow and dark crimson flowers.

== Description ==
Daviesia dilatata is an erect, open, glabrous, shrub with greyish to glaucous foliage, and that typically grows to a height of up to 1 m (3 ft 3 in). Its leaves are reduced to scattered, erect but down-curved, often sickle-shaped phyllodes 7–50 mm (0.28–1.97 in) long and 2–8 mm (0.079–0.315 in) wide with a sharply pointed black tip. The flowers are arranged in clusters of three to eight on a peduncle up to 0.5 mm (0.020 in) long, the rachis 1–2 mm (0.039–0.079 in) long, each flower on a thread-like pedicel 1–3.5 mm (0.039–0.138 in) long with spatula-shaped bracts about 1 mm (0.039 in) long at the base. The sepals are 4–5 mm (0.16–0.20 in) long and joined at the base, the two upper lobes joined for most of their length and the lower three triangular. The standard is elliptic with a central notch, 6.0–6.5 mm (0.24–0.26 in) long, 6–7.5 mm (0.24–0.30 in) wide and orange with a red base and a yellow centre, the wings 6–6.5 mm (0.24–0.26 in) long and dark crimson, and the keel 5–6 mm (0.20–0.24 in) long and dark crimson. Flowering occurs in August and September and the fruit is a flattened, triangular pod 7–8 mm (0.28–0.31 in) long.

== Taxonomy and naming ==
Daviesia dilatata was first formally described in 1995 by Michael Crisp in the journal Australian Systematic Botany from specimens collected near Ravensthorpe in 1979. The specific epithet (dilatata) means "enlarged", referring to the phyllodes that widen upwards.

== Distribution and habitat ==
This species of pea grows in heath and tall shrubland between Nyabing, Bremer Bay and Cape Arid National Park in the Esperance Plains, Jarrah Forest and Mallee biogeographic regions of south-western Western Australia.

== Conservation status ==
Daviesia dilatata is classified as "not threatened" by the Western Australian Government Department of Biodiversity, Conservation and Attractions.
