= Chinocup Nature Reserve =

Nature reserve in Western Australia

- IUCN category Ia (strict nature reserve)
- Location within Western Australia
- Location: Western Australia
- Nearest city: Lake Grace and Pingrup
- Coordinates: 33.242852°S 118.392369°E
- Area: 19,825 ha (76.54 sq mi)
- Established: 1967

Chinocup Nature Reserve is located in the Mallee bioregion of Western Australia. It stretches along a set of north-south running lakes, the main ones being Lake Grace South, Lake Altham, Lake Pingrup, Lake Dorothy and Lake Chinocup.

It was gazetted on 20 January 1967 and has a size of 198.25 square kilometres (76.54 mi^{2}).

The nature reserve stretches through the localities of South Lake Grace and Neendaling in the Shire of Lake Grace through to Pingrup in the Shire of Kent. The townsite of Chinocup sits at its south-western corner.

The smaller Chinocup Dam Nature Reserve lies to the south-west of Chinocup Nature Reserve, was gazetted on 7 January 2022, and has a size of 5.8 square kilometres (2.2 mi^{2}).
