= Chinocup, Western Australia =

Town in the Shire of Kent, Western Australia

Chinocup
- Town
- Interactive map of Chinocup
- Coordinates: 33.533°S 118.383°E
- Country: Australia
- State: Western Australia
- LGA: Shire of Kent
- Location: 393 km (244 mi) south east of Perth; 48 km (30 mi) south of Lake Grace
- Established: 1923

Government
  - State electorate: Roe
  - Federal division: O'Connor

Area
  - Total: 2.49 km^{2} (0.96 sq mi)
- Elevation: 297 m (974 ft)
- Postcode: 6343

Chinocup is a small town in the locality of Pingrup, Shire of Kent, Great Southern region of Western Australia. It is situated between the towns of Nyabing and Pingrup.

It was originally a station on the former Nyabing to Pingrup railway. Land was soon in demand in the area around the station, and blocks were surveyed and released in 1923. The townsite was gazetted as Chinokup later the same year; the spelling was changed to its present form in 1962.

The name is named after the nearby Lake Chinocup, which had been recorded when the area was explored in 1879. The name is Aboriginal in origin but its meaning is unknown. The lake is part of the Chinocup Nature Reserve.

A freak storm hit the area in January 1951, stripping leaves from trees and any hay left standing. Large hailstones caused some damage to properties and heavy rain filled dams and washed out fences. 250 points (2.5 inches, 64 mm (Note: 1 point is 1/100th of an inch)) of rain were recorded in a few hours in some areas.

Stock yards were erected alongside the railway station in 1929 to assist farmers in moving stock by rail and to encourage further production of sheep and other stock in the area.
