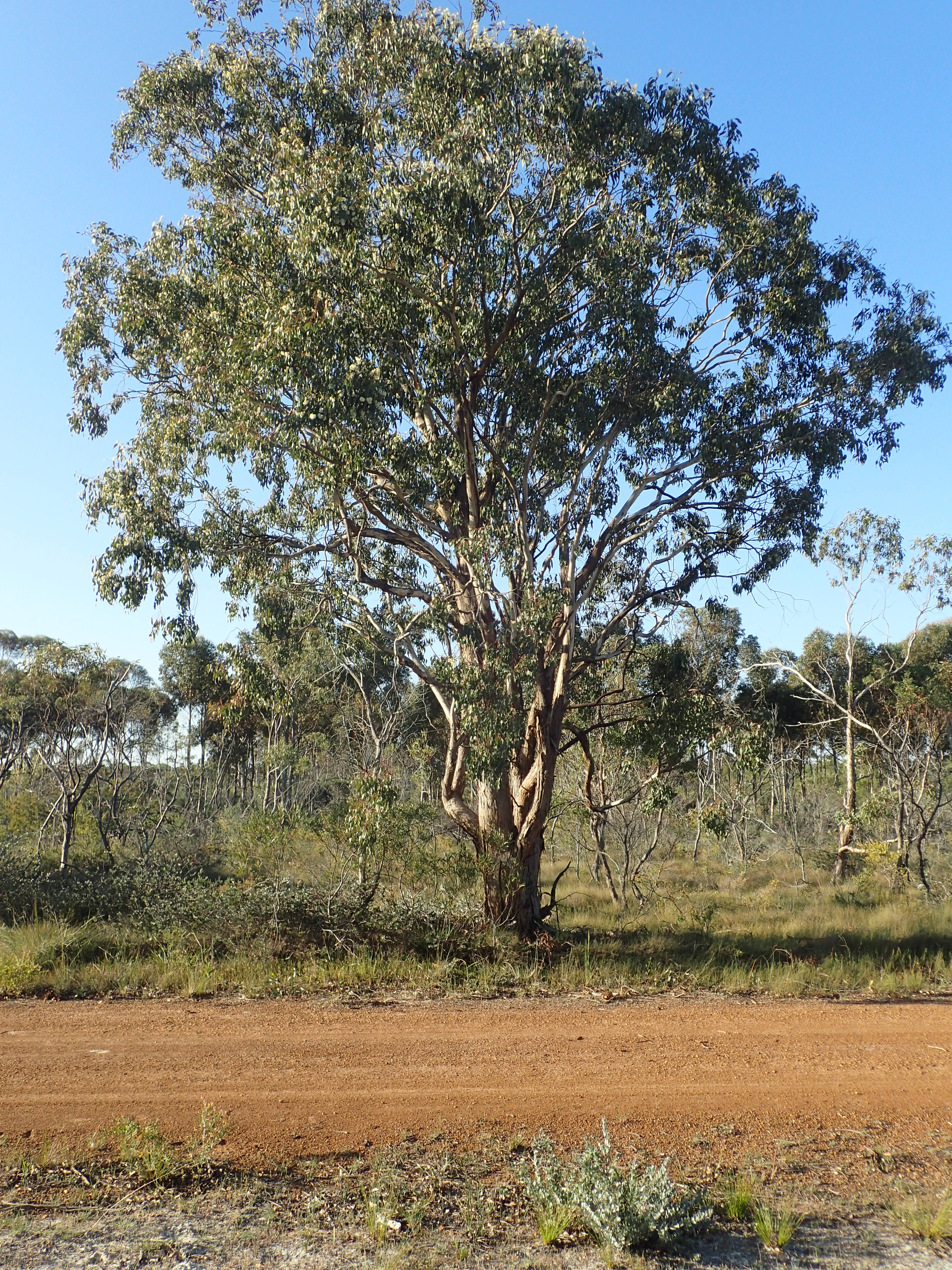
- Eucalyptus sheathiana in Helms Arboretum, near Esperance

Conservation status
- Vulnerable (IUCN 3.1)

Scientific classification
- Kingdom: Plantae
- Clade: Tracheophytes
- Clade: Angiosperms
- Clade: Eudicots
- Clade: Rosids
- Order: Myrtales
- Family: Myrtaceae
- Genus: Eucalyptus
- Species: E. sheathiana

Binomial name
- Eucalyptus sheathiana Maiden

= Eucalyptus sheathiana =

Ribbon-barked gum

Species of eucalyptus

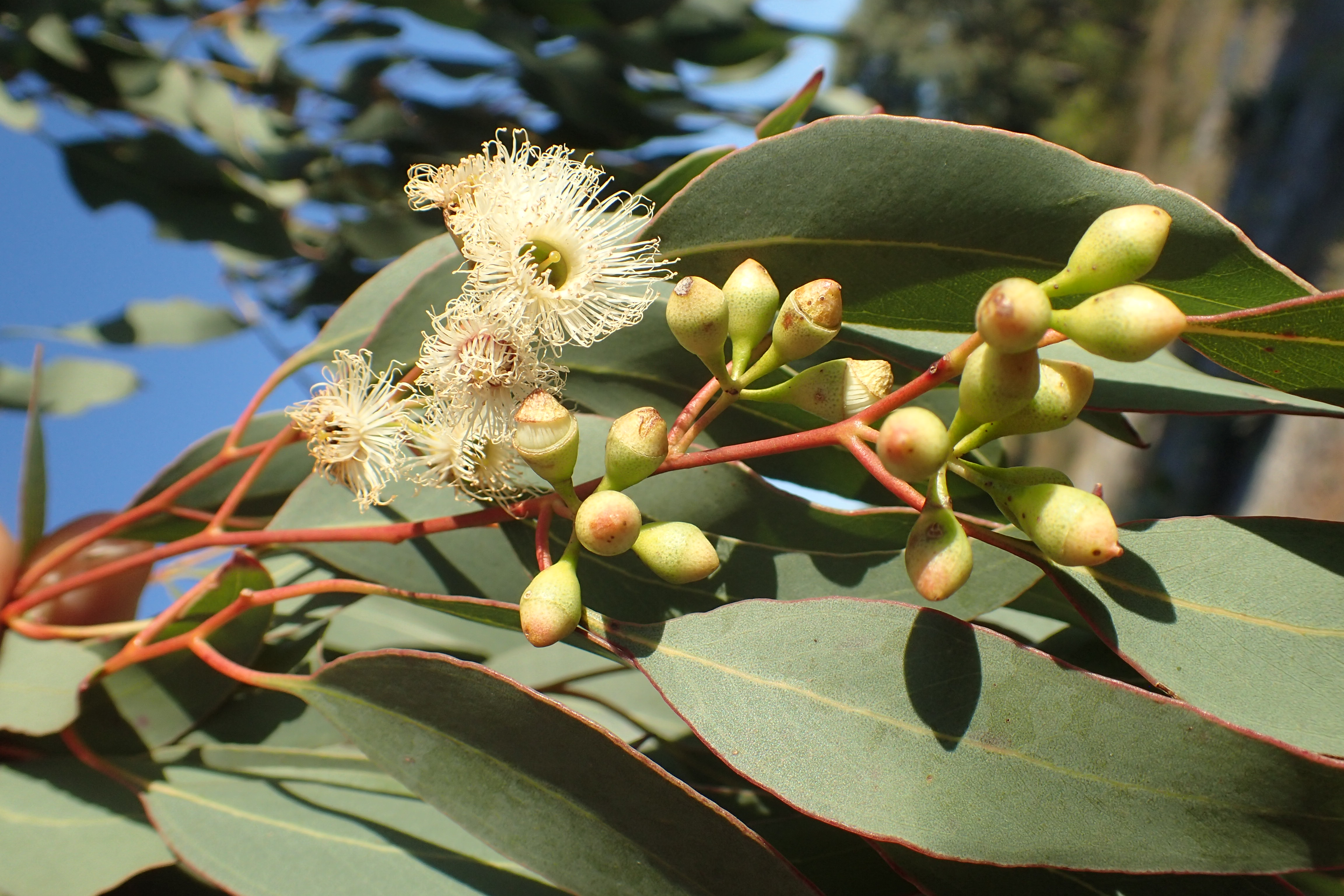
Flower buds and flowers

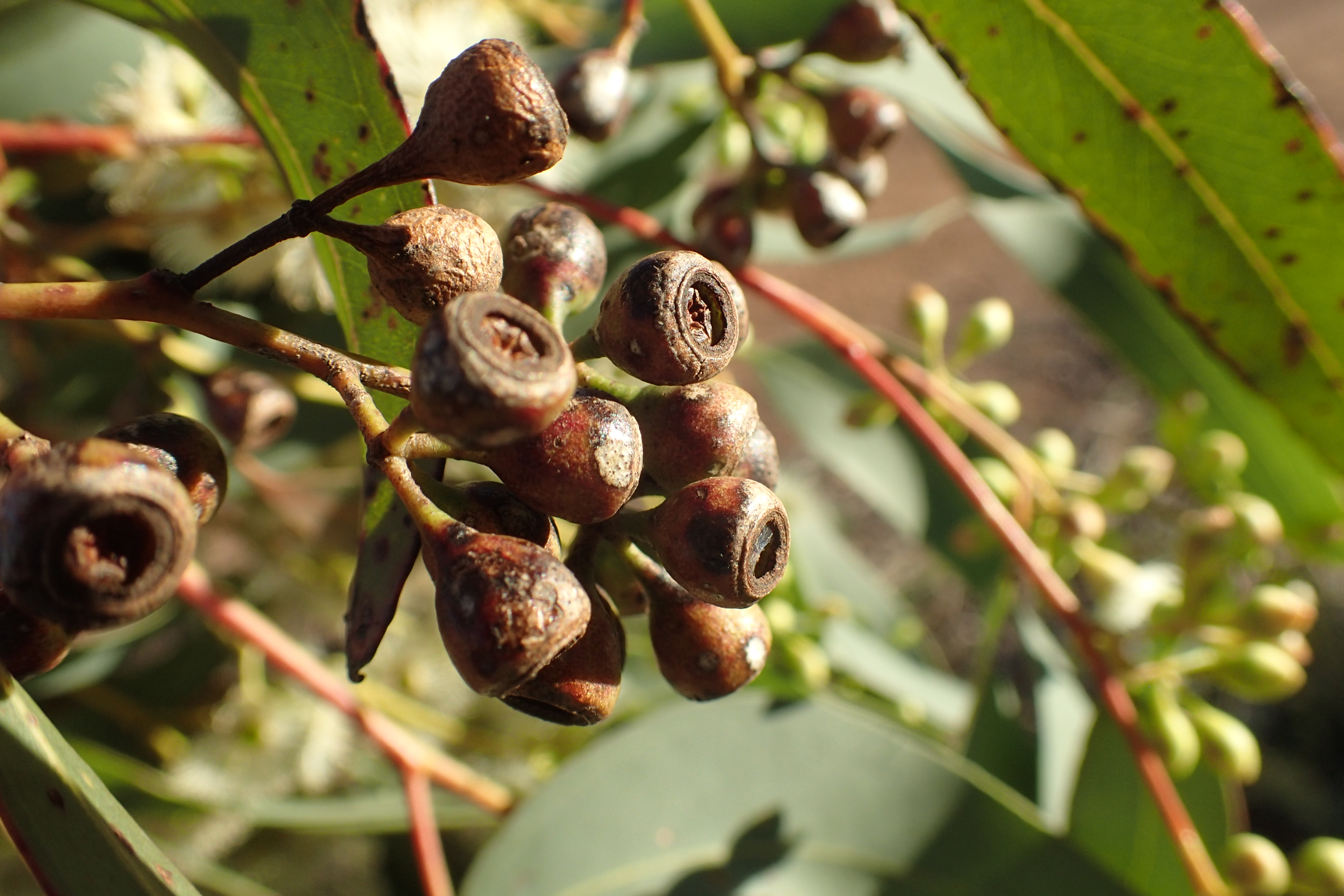
Fruit

Eucalyptus sheathiana, commonly known as ribbon-barked gum or ribbon-barked mallee, is a species of tree or a mallee that is endemic to Western Australia. It has smooth bark that is shed in long ribbons, lance-shaped adult leaves, flower buds in groups of seven, creamy white flowers and conical to cup-shaped fruit.

== Description ==
Eucalyptus sheathiana is a tree or a mallee, that typically grows to a height of 3–15 m (9.8–49.2 ft) and forms a lignotuber. It has smooth, greyish bark that is shed in long ribbons. Young plants and coppice regrowth have greyish green, egg-shaped to lance-shaped leaves that are 75–125 mm (3.0–4.9 in) long and 25–40 mm (0.98–1.57 in) wide. Adult leaves are lance-shaped, 75–135 mm (3.0–5.3 in) long and 8–18 mm (0.31–0.71 in) wide, tapering to a petiole 10–28 mm (0.39–1.10 in) long. The flower buds are arranged in leaf axils on an unbranched peduncle 5–20 mm (0.20–0.79 in) long, the individual buds on pedicels 3–7 mm (0.12–0.28 in) long. Mature buds are oval to pear-shaped, 6–12 mm (0.24–0.47 in) long and 4–7 mm (0.16–0.28 in) wide with a conical operculum. Flowering occurs from January to April and the flowers are creamy white. The fruit is a woody conical to cup-shaped capsule 5–10 mm (0.20–0.39 in) long and 5–8 mm (0.20–0.31 in) wide with the valves near rim level.

== Taxonomy and naming ==
Eucalyptus sheathiana was first formally described in 1916 by Joseph Maiden from material collected in Kings Park by Jeremiah Sheath (1850–1915), in turn, from seed collected from the "Eastern Gold Fields near the South Australian border". The specific epithet (sheathiana) honour the collector of the type specimens.

== Distribution and habitat ==
This eucalypt is found on plains in the southern wheatbelt between Wongan Hills, Nyabing and Lake King, and in nearby parts of the Goldfields-Esperance region. It grows in shrubland on sandy lateritic soils.

== Conservation status ==
This eucalypt is classified as "not threatened" by the Western Australian Government Department of Parks and Wildlife. The IUCN Red List assesses the species as Vulnerable.

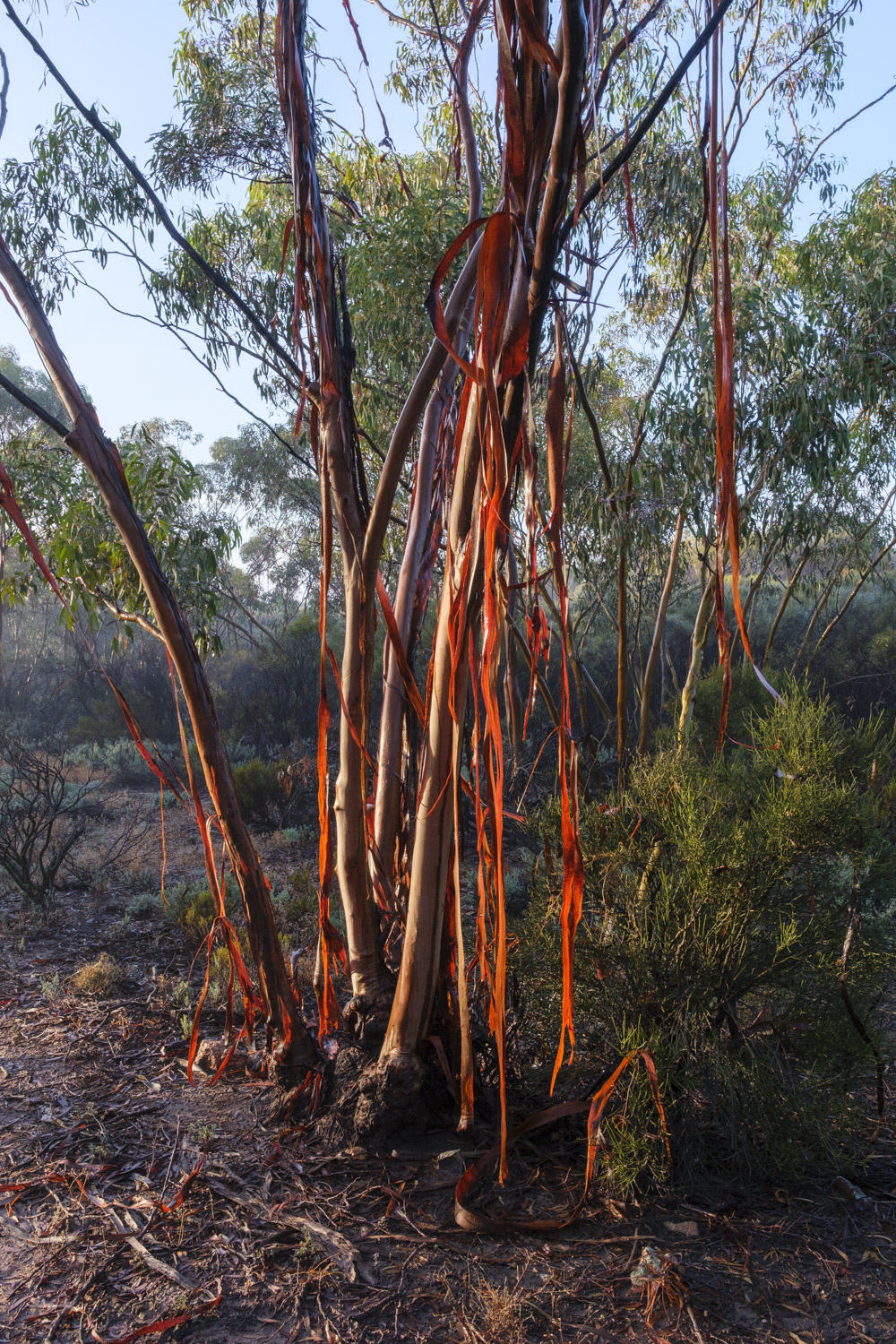
Example of the distinctive ribbon bark shed by Eucalyptus sheathiana

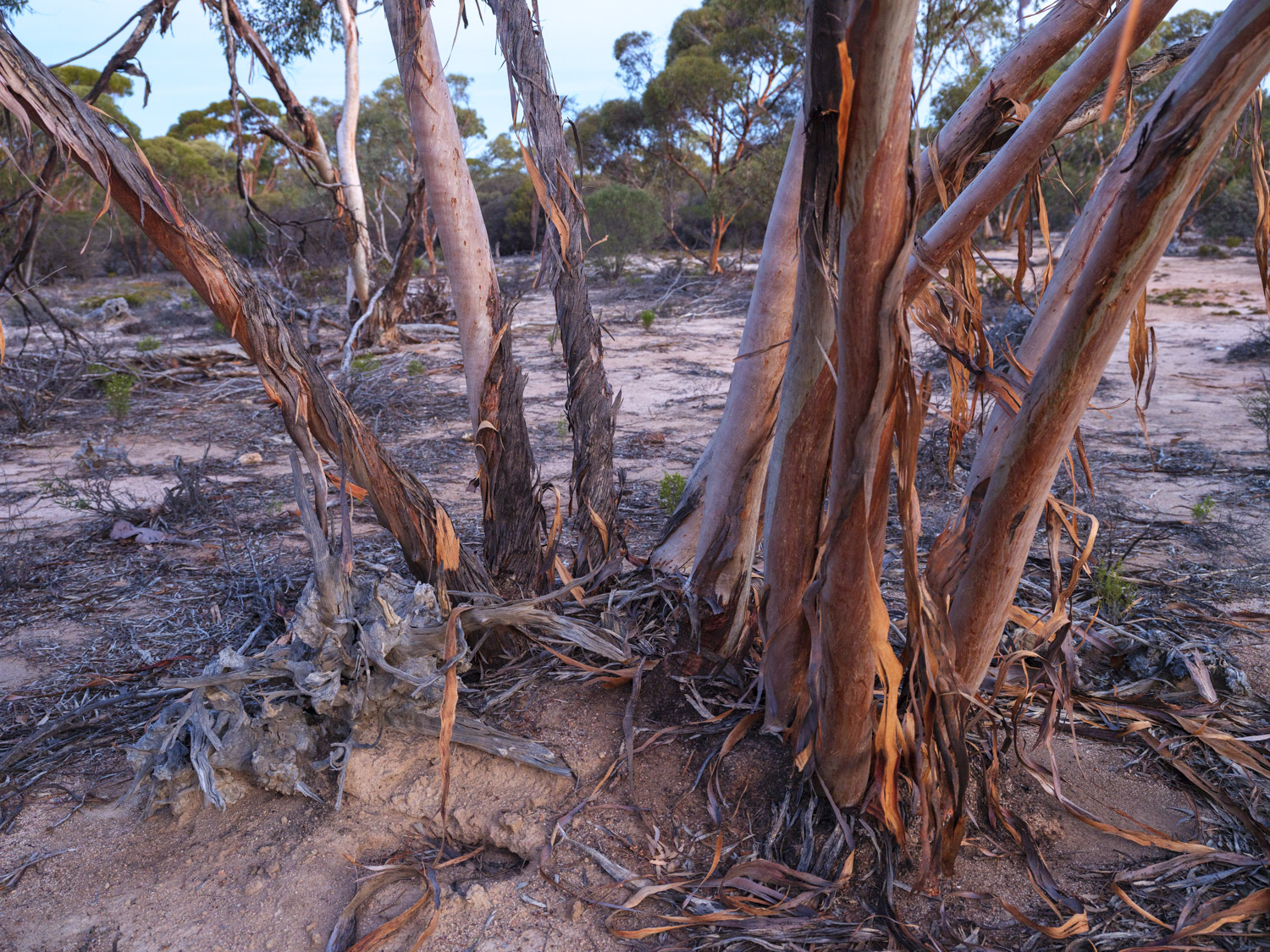
This gum is a mallee with its extensive root system meaning it could be hundreds of years old

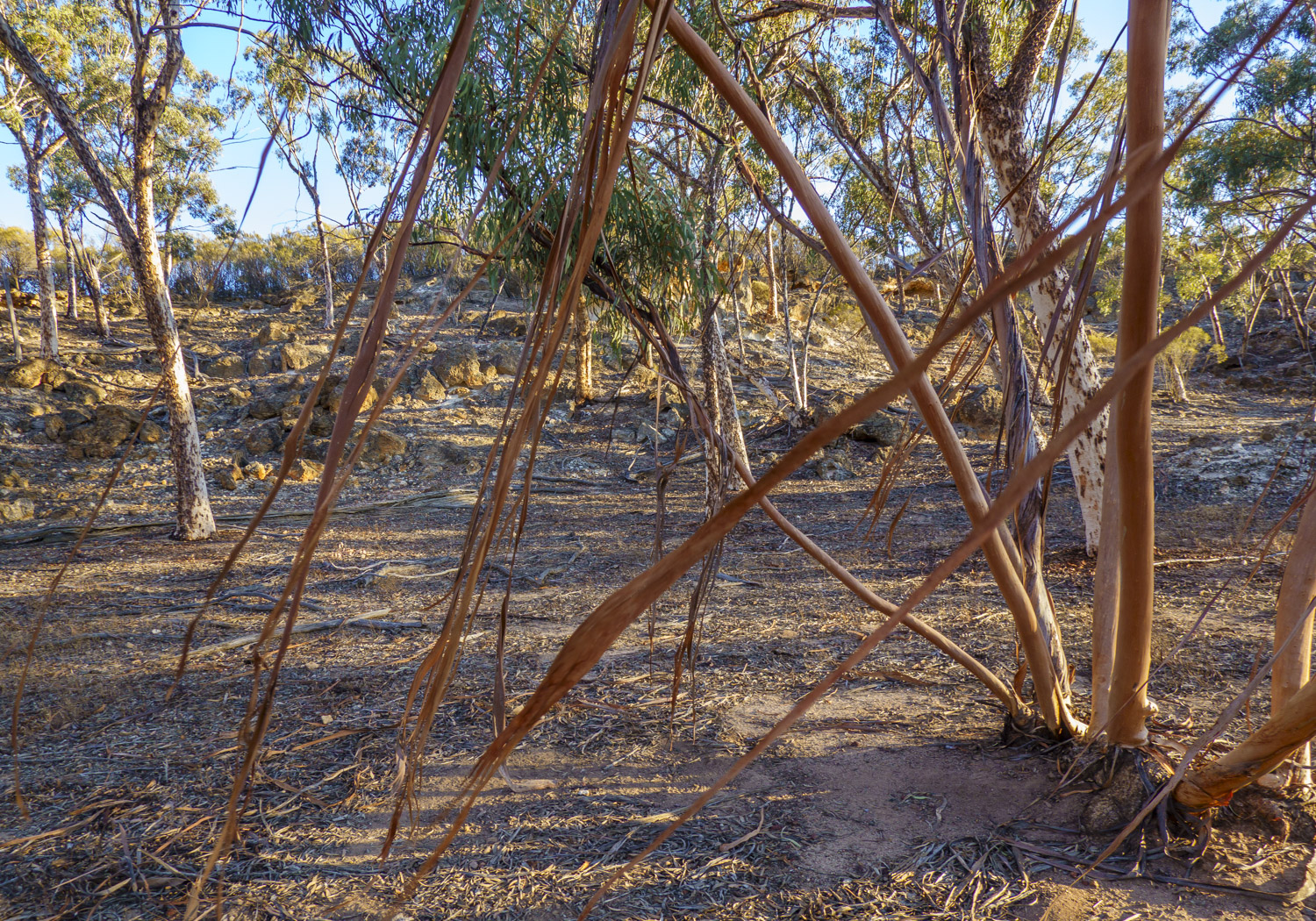
The ribbons of bark regularly reach the ground and sway in the breeze

== See also ==
- List of Eucalyptus species
