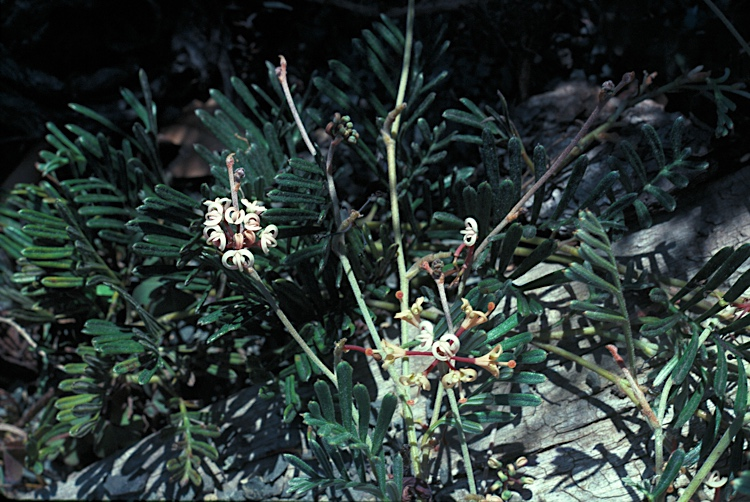
- Grevillea prostrata

Conservation status
- Priority Four — Rare Taxa (DEC)

Scientific classification
- Kingdom: Plantae
- Clade: Tracheophytes
- Clade: Angiosperms
- Clade: Eudicots
- Order: Proteales
- Family: Proteaceae
- Genus: Grevillea
- Species: G. prostrata

Binomial name
- Grevillea prostrata C.A.Gardner & A.S.George

= Grevillea prostrata =

Pallarup grevillea

Species of shrub endemic to Western Australia

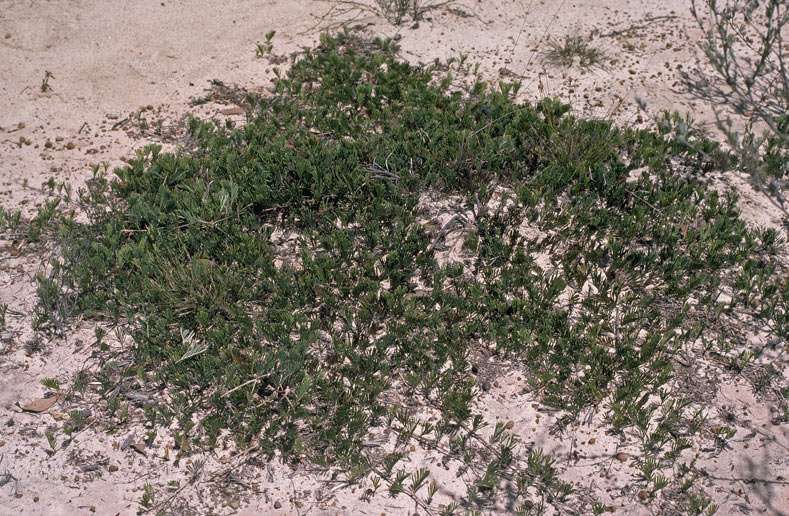
Habit near Lake King

Grevillea prostrata, commonly known as the Pallarup grevillea, is a species of flowering plant in the family Proteaceae and is endemic to a small area in the southwest of Western Australia. It is a prostrate shrub with more or less pinnatisect leaves and pink and white flowers with a white style.

== Description ==
Grevillea prostrata is a prostrate shrub that typically grows to 4–10 cm (1.6–3.9 in) high, 0.8–1.2 m (2 ft 7 in – 3 ft 11 in) wide and sometimes forms a mat. Its leaves are pinnatisect, 30–70 mm (1.2–2.8 in) long, the lobes in more or less opposite pairs and closely-spaced. The lobes are narrow wedge-shaped to oblong or linear, 10–40 mm (0.39–1.57 in) long and 1–2 mm (0.039–0.079 in) wide with the edges rolled under. The flowers are mostly arranged on the ends of trailing branchlets, in umbel-like clusters, on a rachis 5–13 mm (0.20–0.51 in) long. The flowers are pale pink and white, the style white turning pinkish red as it ages, the pistil 6–9 mm (0.24–0.35 in) long. Flowering occurs from September to November, and the fruit is a rough, hairy, oval or oblong follicle 13–16 mm (0.51–0.63 in) long.

== Taxonomy ==
Grevillea prostrata was first formally described in 1963 by Charles Gardner and Alex George in the Journal of the Royal Society of Western Australia from specimens collected by George near Pallarup Rocks, south-east of Lake King in 1960. The specific epithet (prostrata) means "lying on the ground".

== Distribution and habitat ==
Pallarup grevillea grows in heath and shrubland on sandplains between Pingrup, Hyden and Lake King in the Coolgardie, Esperance Plains and Mallee bioregions of south-western Western Australia.

== Conservation status ==
Grevillea prostrata is listed as "Priority Four" by the Government of Western Australia Department of Biodiversity, Conservation and Attractions, meaning that it is rare or near threatened.

== See also ==
- List of Grevillea species
