= Lists of lakes of Western Australia =

The following lists of lakes of Western Australia are arranged alphabetically:

- List of lakes of Western Australia, A–C (plus numerals)
- List of lakes of Western Australia, D–K
- List of lakes of Western Australia, L–P
- List of lakes of Western Australia, Q–Z
