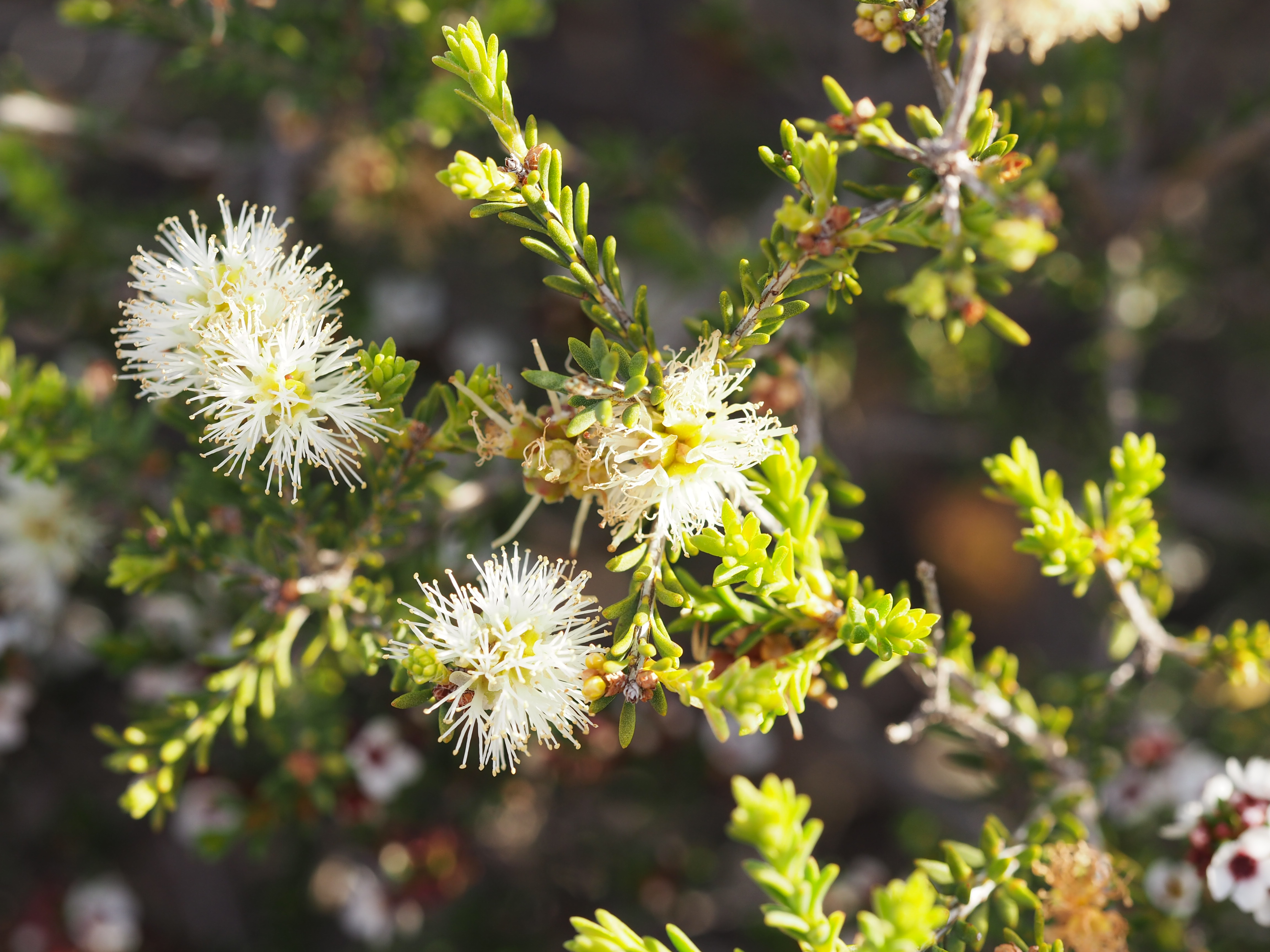

Scientific classification
- Kingdom: Plantae
- Clade: Tracheophytes
- Clade: Angiosperms
- Clade: Eudicots
- Clade: Rosids
- Order: Myrtales
- Family: Myrtaceae
- Genus: Melaleuca
- Species: M. bracteosa

Binomial name
- Melaleuca bracteosa Turcz.

= Melaleuca bracteosa =

Species of shrub

Melaleuca bracteosa is a low, spreading shrub in the myrtle family, Myrtaceae and is endemic to the south-west of Western Australia. It has tiny, fleshy, non-prickly leaves and cream flowerheads.

== Description ==
Melaleuca bracteosa is sometimes an erect shrub to a height of 1.5 metres (5 ft) but is more usually a low, dense spreading shrub to about 0.5 m (2 ft). Its leaves are narrow oval in shape, 2.7–9 mm (0.1–0.4 in) long and 0.9–1.5 mm (0.04–0.06 in), glabrous, bright green and fleshy with a blunt tip.

The flowers are usually bright cream coloured but sometimes white or mauve-pink. They are in heads, sometimes on the ends of branches and sometimes on the sides of the stem, each head about 16 mm (0.6 in) in diameter and containing 5 to 20 individual flowers. The stamens are arranged in five bundles around the flower, each bundle containing 3 to 8 stamens. The flowering season lasts from August to November and is followed by fruit which are woody capsules 2.4–3.2 mm (0.09–0.1 in) long.

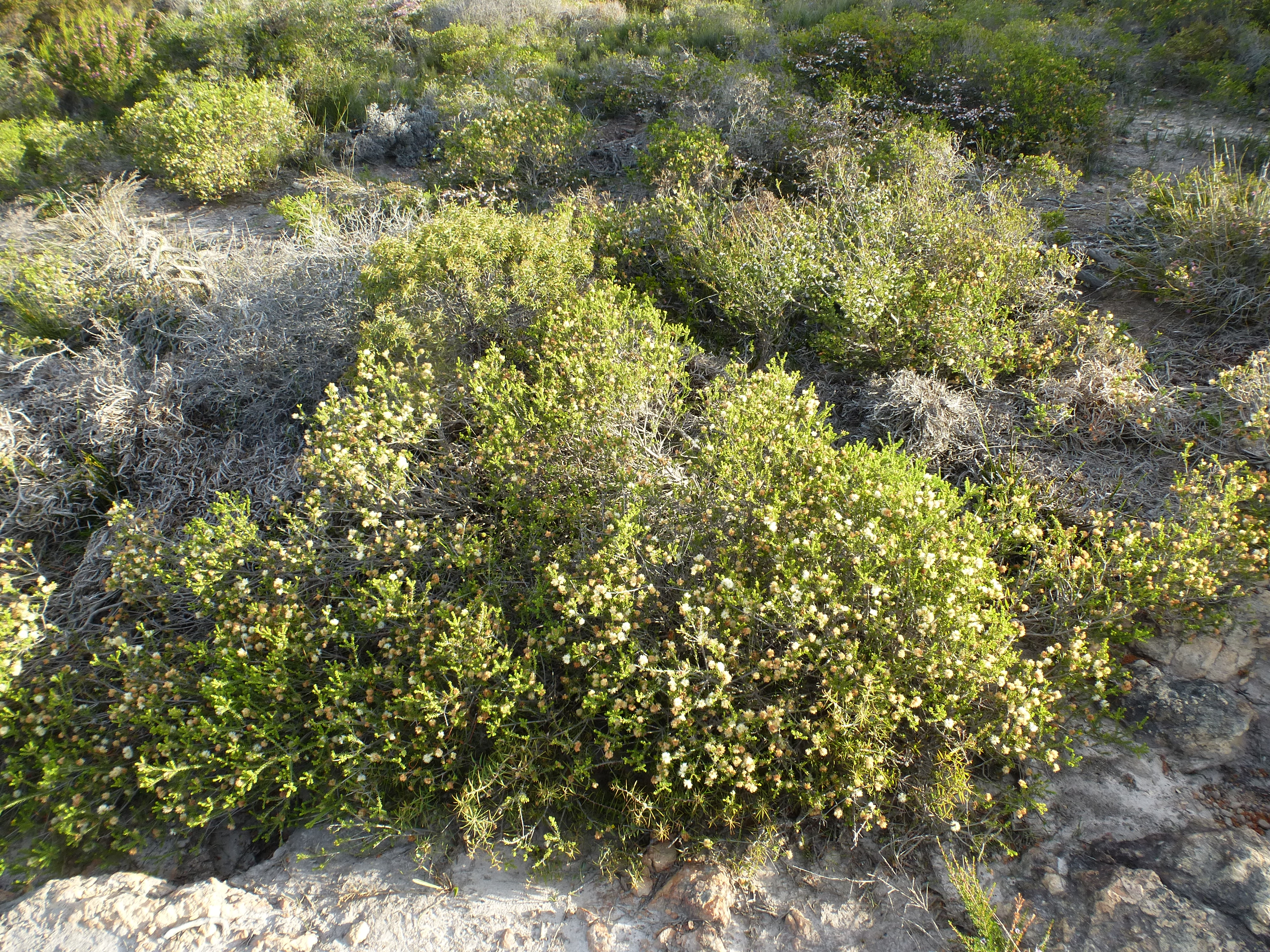
Habit at Cape Riche

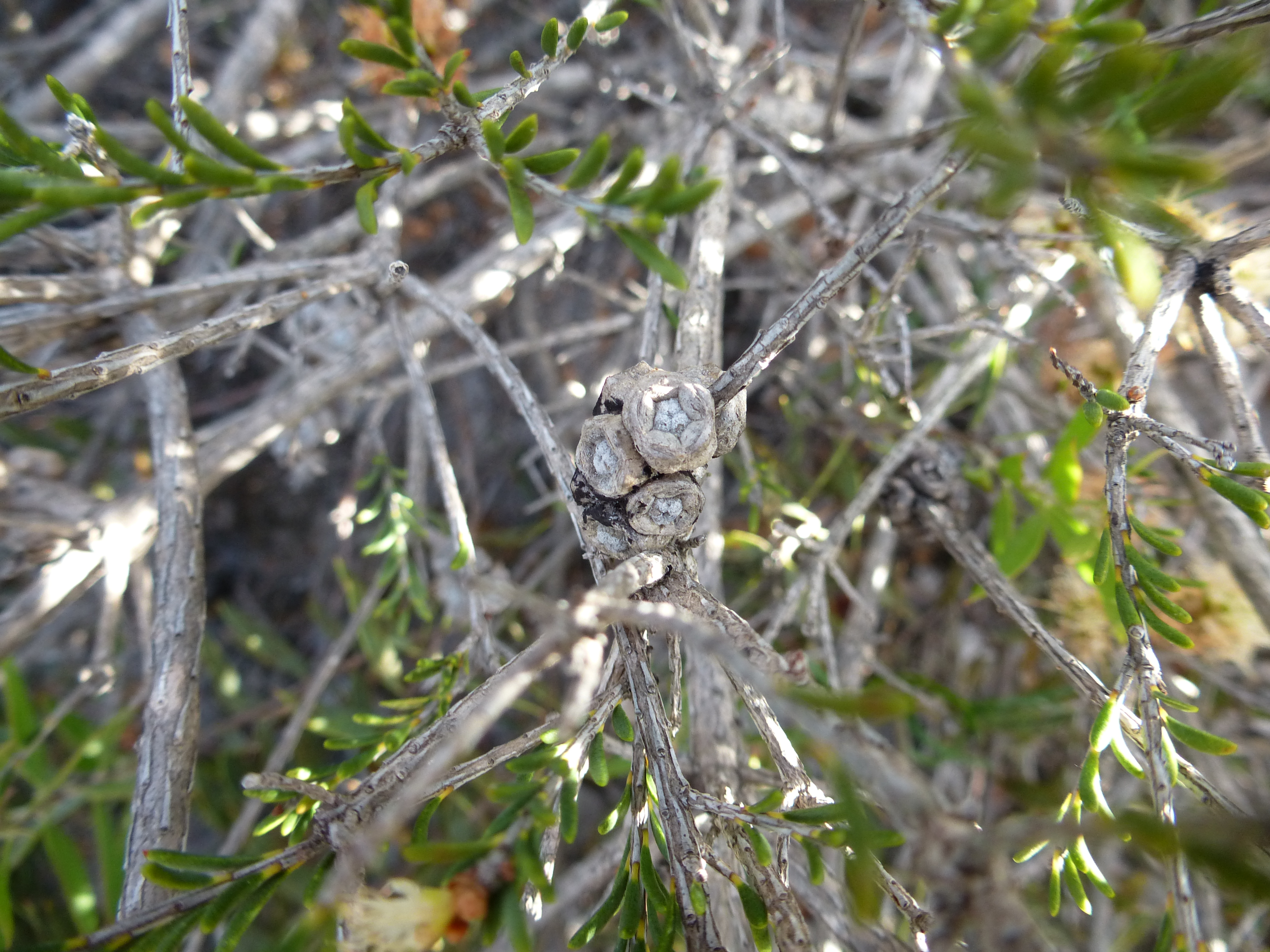
Fruit

== Taxonomy and naming ==
This species was first formally described in 1847 by the Russian botanist Nikolai Turczaninow in Bulletin de la classe physico-mathematique de l'Academie Imperiale des sciences de Saint-Petersburg. The specific epithet (bracteosa) is from the Latin bractea, meaning bract, referring to the persistent bracts of the flowers.

== Distribution and habitat ==
This melaleuca occurs from the Pingrup district south to Albany and east to Ravensthorpe in the Avon Wheatbelt, Esperance Plains, Jarrah Forest and Mallee biogeographic regions. It grows in sand, loam or clay on winter-wet flats or plains often under low trees or tall shrubs.

== Conservation status ==
Melaleuca bracteosa is classified as not threatened by the Government of Western Australia Department of Parks and Wildlife.

== Uses ==
=== Essential oils ===
This species produces sesquiterpene oils at a rate of 0.3% (weight for weight) from fresh leaves.
