= Lake Chinocup =

Lake in Western Australia

- Location in Western Australia
- Interactive map of Lake Chinocup
- Location: Great Southern, Western Australia
- Coordinates: 33°29′56″S 118°24′59″E
- Type: Saline
- Primary inflows: Groundwater and surface runoff
- Catchment area: 3,500 km^{2} (1,400 sq mi)
- Basin countries: Australia
- Surface area: 12,000 ha (30,000 acres)
- Surface elevation: 280 m (920 ft)

Lake Chinocup, sometimes referred to as Chinocup Lake, is a salt lake in the Great Southern region of Western Australia located in the Shire of Kent between the towns of Nyabing and Pingrup and about 1 km (0.62 mi) north of the location of Chinocup. The location takes its name from the lake; the name is an Aboriginal word of unknown meaning. The lake was named in 1879.

The lake is one of many in the Chinocup Lake system that runs in a north to south direction between Pingrup and Lake Grace and are part of an ancient river system. Some of the lakes are pink in colour as a result of the presence of Halobacterium.

Lake Chinocup is part of the Chinocup Nature Reserve, gazetted on 20 January 1967 and has a size of 198.25 square kilometres (76.54 mi^{2}).

The lake occupies an area of 12,000 ha (30,000 acres) and makes up part of the Lake Chinocup Reserve, which has a total area of 19,825 ha (48,990 acres). The catchment area of the lake is 3,500 km^{2} (1,400 sq mi), made up of Lake Chinocup Reserve, Lake Magenta Reserve (approximately 94,000 ha (230,000 acres)) and surrounding farmland.

The lake system is part of the Lockhart River catchment, which is part of the even larger Avon River basin. The Pingrup River, also part of the Lockhart system, originates from Lake Chinocup.

Vegetation around the lake starts with fringing samphire followed by Melaleuca scrub and a small area of Casuarina obesa. Further from the lake and usually on higher dune areas is found mallee scrub woodlands. The overstorey of the woodlands is Eucalyptus incrassata, Eucalyptus kondininensis and Eucalyptus phaenophylla with species such as Adenanthos pungens in the understorey. Two rare species of plant and six priority species are found within the reserve.

A gypsum mine on the edge of the lake in the reserve was proposed in 1994. The mining area would be around 70 ha (170 acres) in size and the mining company would have to pay a considerable bond to ensure rehabilitation works are completed when mining ceases.

== See also ==
- List of lakes of Australia § Western Australia
