= Fraser Lake (Minnesota) =

Lake in the state of Minnesota, United States

- Location within Minnesota
- Location: Lake County, Minnesota
- Coordinates: 48°0′40″N 91°11′55″W
- Type: lake

Fraser Lake is a lake in Lake County, in the U.S. state of Minnesota.

Fraser Lake was named for John Fraser, a lumberman.

== See also ==
- List of lakes in Minnesota
