= Pingrup railway line =

Former railway line in Western Australia

Katanning to Pingrup railway line

Overview
- Status: Closed
- Owner: Government of Western Australia
- Locale: Great Southern, Western Australia
- Termini: Katanning; Pingrup

Service
- Operator(s): Western Australian Government Railways

History
- Commenced: 1911
- Opened: 27 October 1923
- Section 1 opened: Katanning to Nyabing: 3 April 1912
- Section 2 opened: Nyabing to Pingrup: 27 October 1923
- Closed: 1957

Technical
- Line length: 95 km (59 mi)
- Track gauge: 1,067 mm (3 ft 6 in)
- Katanning to Pingrup railway line Main locations

The Katanning to Pingrup railway line was a state government-owned and Western Australian Government Railways-operated railway line connecting Katanning to Pingrup via Nyabing in the Great Southern region of Western Australia. The railway line was 95 kilometres (59 mi) long. At its western end, at Katanning, it connected to the Great Southern Railway. At Katanning, it also connected to the Donnybrook–Katanning railway, which closed in 1982.

The line from Katanning to Nyabing still exists but is not in operation while the line further east, from Nyabing to Pingrup no longer exists, having closed in 1957.

== History ==
The Great Southern Railway, passing through Katanning, was established in 1889, having been constructed in a three-year period from 1886. At Katanning, it also connected to the Donnybrook–Katanning railway, which had opened to Kojonup in 1907 and eventually connected to the Donnybrook line at Boyup Brook in May 1912.

The Katanning to Nyabing, then still referred to as Nampup but renamed soon after, was awarded for construction on 28 March 1911. Unlike most other railways in Western Australia at this point, which were constructed by the state's Public Works Department (PWD), Katanning to Nyabing was constructed by a private company, the Vincent Brothers. Vincent Brothers were also responsible for the construction of the Boyup Brook to Kojonup and the Tanbellup to Gnowangerup and Ongerup lines at the time. The Katanning to Nyabing, with a length of 61 kilometres (38 mi), was officially opened on 3 April 1912. The official opening took place in the presence of the Premier of Western Australia, John Scaddan, and the Minister for Railways, Philip Collier.

The construction of the second section of the line did not start for another decade, despite having been committed to much earlier, being held up by the effects of World War I and a lack of manpower. The contract for the 34-kilometre (21 mi) section from Nyabing to Pingrup awarded on 24 July 1922. This section was constructed by the PWD and officially opened on Saturday, 27 October 1923 by Francis Newdegate, the Governor of Western Australia.

In 1926, it was proposed to extend the railway line a further 40 kilometres (25 mi) to the east, to Magenta in what is now the Shire of Lake Grace, but this was not carried out as the quality of the land there was seen as too poor to warrant expansion.

The line closed in 1957 and the Nyabing to Pingrup section never reopened. In 1954, the state government of Western Australia had compiled a list of loss-making railway operations, of which the Katanning to Pingrup line was one, having had a total expenditure of almost four times its earnings in the financial year to June 1953: £A 40,223, equivalent to A$1.6 million in 2022, expenditure versus earnings of £A 11,781. The Katanning to Pingrup and Gnowangerup to Ongerup line closures in mid-1957 did result in a protest meeting in Katanning, where a number of state politicians were present to support the protest motion.

The Katanning to Nyabing section eventually reopened, running seasonally during the summer month, but closed again in 2005.

Arc Infrastructure deems the railway line to be part of its Grain Freight Rail Network, which, in 2017, accounted for 50 percent of its network but only 10 percent of its freight. The line to Nyabing was classified as Tier 3.

In 2021, it was estimated that it would cost A$87.76 million to upgrade the Katanning to Nyabing section of the railway line to reopen it.

== Acts of Parliament ==
Three acts of Parliament exist in relation to the railway, the first one being the Katanning–Nampup Railway Act 1911, which was assented to on 16 February 1911 and authorised the construction of the railway line from Katanning to Nampup, with the latter soon renamed to Nyabing.

The second act was the Katanning–Nyabing Railway Extension Act 1914, which was assented to on 18 February 1915 and authorised the construction of the extension of the railway line from Nyabing to Pingrup.

The third act was the Railways (Cue–Big Bell and other Railways) Discontinuance Act 1960 for the closure of the Nyabing to Pingrup section of the railway line, which was assented to on 12 December 1960. This act affected a number of Western Australian railways, officially closing multiple lines:

- Cue to Big Bell
- Meekatharra to Wiluna
- Malcolm to Laverton
- Wokarina to Yuna
- Geraldton to Ajana
- Brookton to Corrigin
- Mukinbudin to Bullfinch, Southern Cross to Bullfinch
- Gnowangerup to Ongerup
- Elleker to Nornalup
- Busselton to Flinders Bay
- Boddington to Narrogin
- Nyabing to Pingrup

== Legacy ==
The railway line from Katanning to Nyabing still exist, designated as "Not in use" on the Arc Infrastructure map.

The former Katanning railway station is on the Shire of Katanning's heritage list, as is the former Railway Hotel and the Railway Memorial, but they are predominantly associated with the Great Southern Railway rather than the Pingrup branch line.

Further east along the line, in the Shire of Kent, the railway station sites at Nyabing and Pingrup are on the heritage list but no structures or buildings from the railway era remain on either site.
