= Margaret Mary Byrne =

American politician

Margaret Mary "Peggy" Byrne
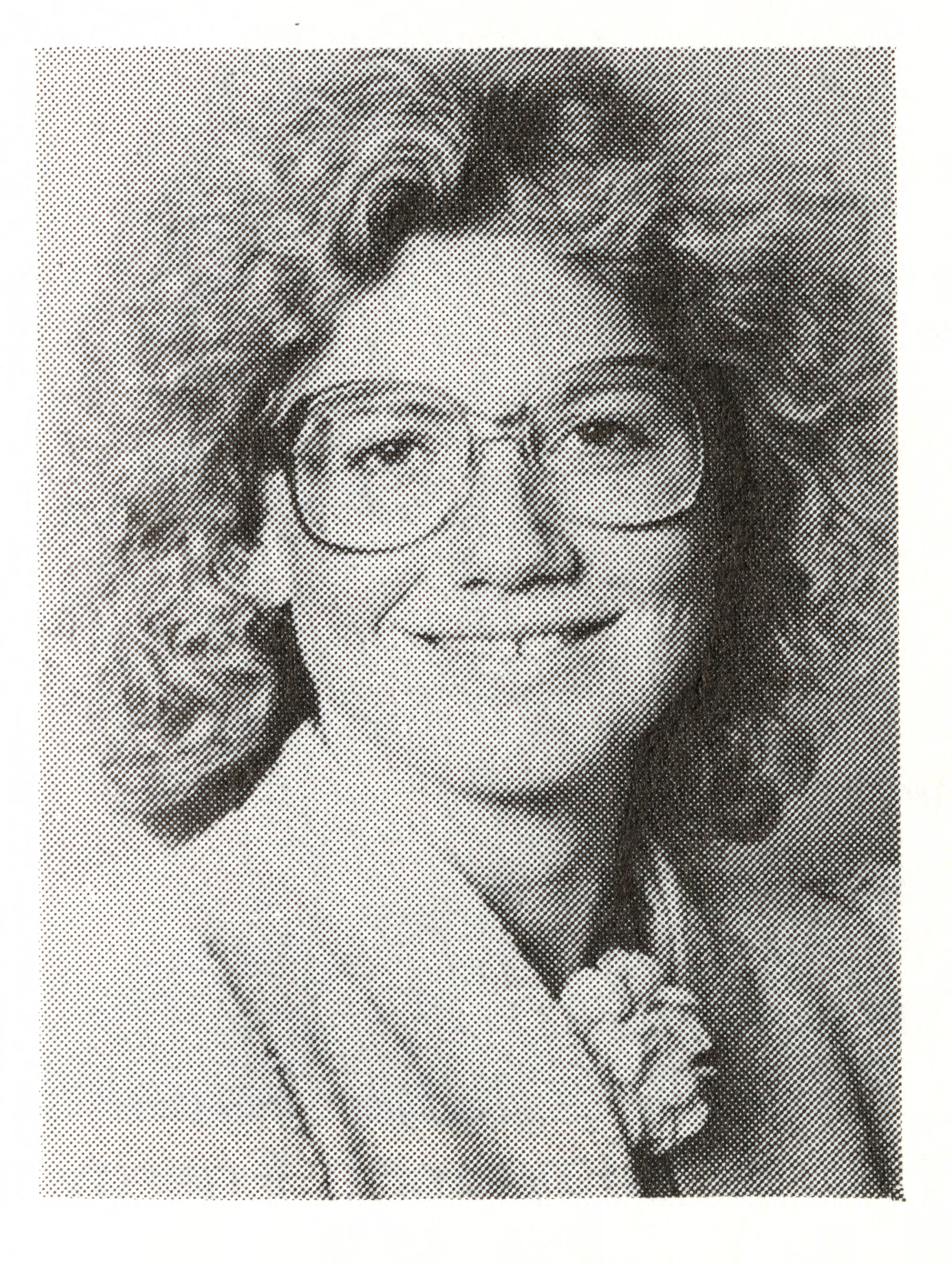

Member of the Minnesota House of Representatives
- In office 1975–1982

Personal details
- Born: December 17, 1949 (age 76) Minneapolis, Minnesota, U.S.
- Party: Democratic
- Education: University of Minnesota
- Profession: Policy analyst

Margaret Mary "Peggy" Byrne (born December 17, 1949) is an American politician.

Byrne was born in Minneapolis, Minnesota and graduated from Saint Joseph's Academy, in Saint Paul, Minnesota, in 1967. Byrne received her bachelor's degree in social psychology and criminal justice from University of Minnesota in 1975. She then went to the Humphrey School of Public Affairs for graduate work. Byrne lived in Saint Paul, Minnesota and was a policy analyst for the Minnesota State Planning agency from 1983 to 1991 and from 1999 to 2000. She also worked for the Minnesota Department of Children, Families and Learning from 2000 to 2003. Byrne served in the Minnesota House of Representatives from 1975 to 1982 and was a Democrat.
