= Lake Grace System =

Wetlands in Western Australia

Lake Grace System is a DIWA-listed wetland in Western Australia. Located on the border of the Shires of Lake Grace and Kent, it consists of four lakes, Lake Grace North, Lake Grace South, Lake Altham and Cemetery Lake. It has an area of about 132 km^{2} (51 sq mi).

Biogeographically, it is part of the Western Mallee subregion of the Mallee region of the South West Botanic Province. It is part of a saline drainage system that extends from near Ongerup, Western Australia, ultimately draining into Salt River. It is a major breeding area for the banded stilt (Cladorhynchus leucocephalus).
