= Lake Grace South =

Lake in Western Australia

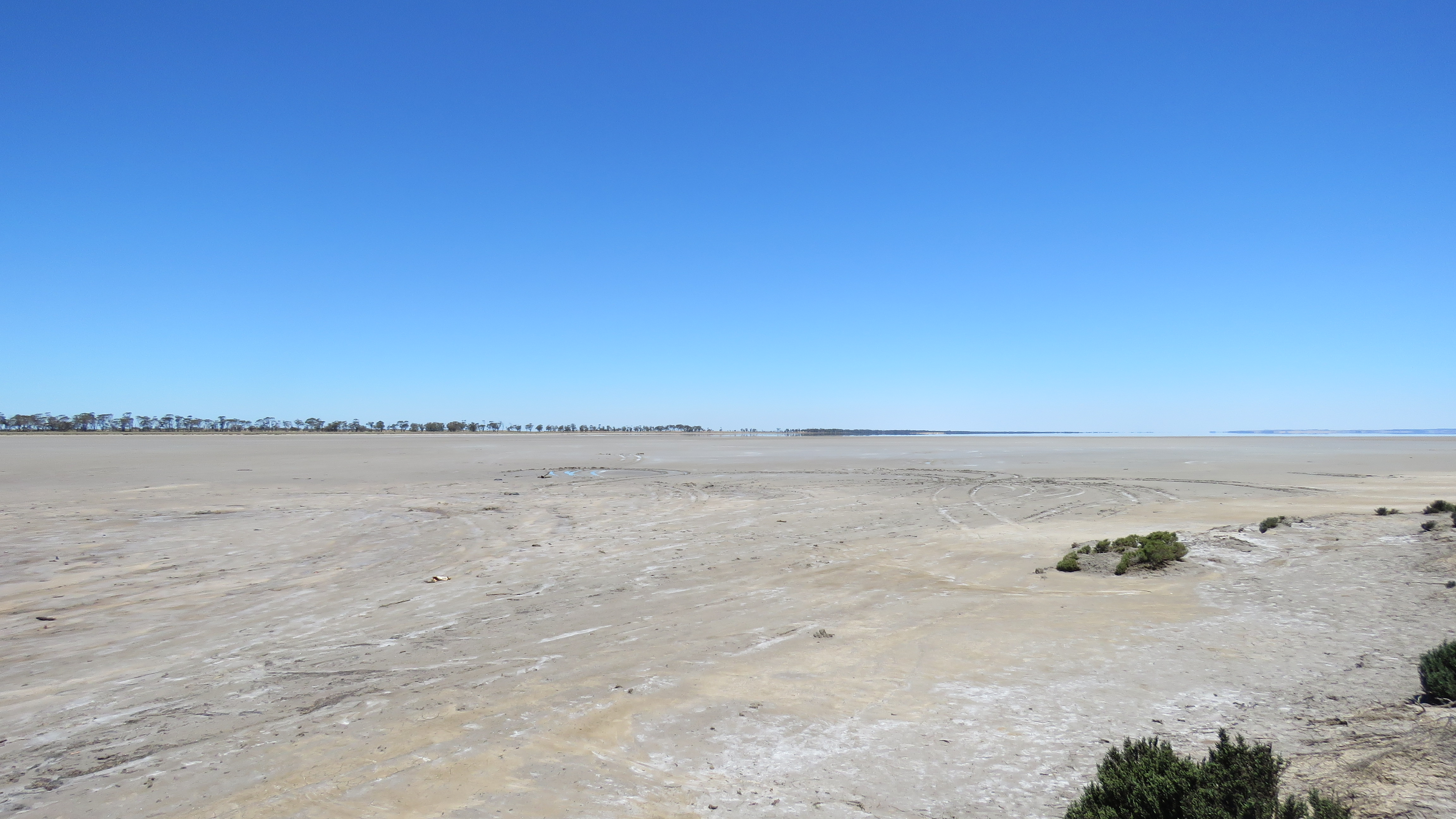
- Lake Grace South seen from the north-west

- Location in Western Australia
- Interactive map of Lake Grace South
- Location: Great Southern, Western Australia
- Coordinates: 33°17′S 118°24′E
- Type: Wetland
- Basin countries: Australia
- Surface area: 56 km^{2} (22 sq mi)

Lake Grace South, part of the Lake Grace System, is a wetland in the Great Southern region of Western Australia. Situated in the Shire of Kent, the lake is part of the Western Mallee subregion of the Mallee region. It has an area of about 56 square kilometres (22 sq mi). It is one of four lakes in the area comprising a DIWA-listed wetland of national importance.

Lake Grace South is part of the Chinocup Nature Reserve, gazetted on 20 January 1967 and has a size of 198.25 square kilometres (76.54 mi^{2}).

== See also ==
- List of lakes of Australia § Western Australia
