= Lake Grace North =

Lake in Western Australia

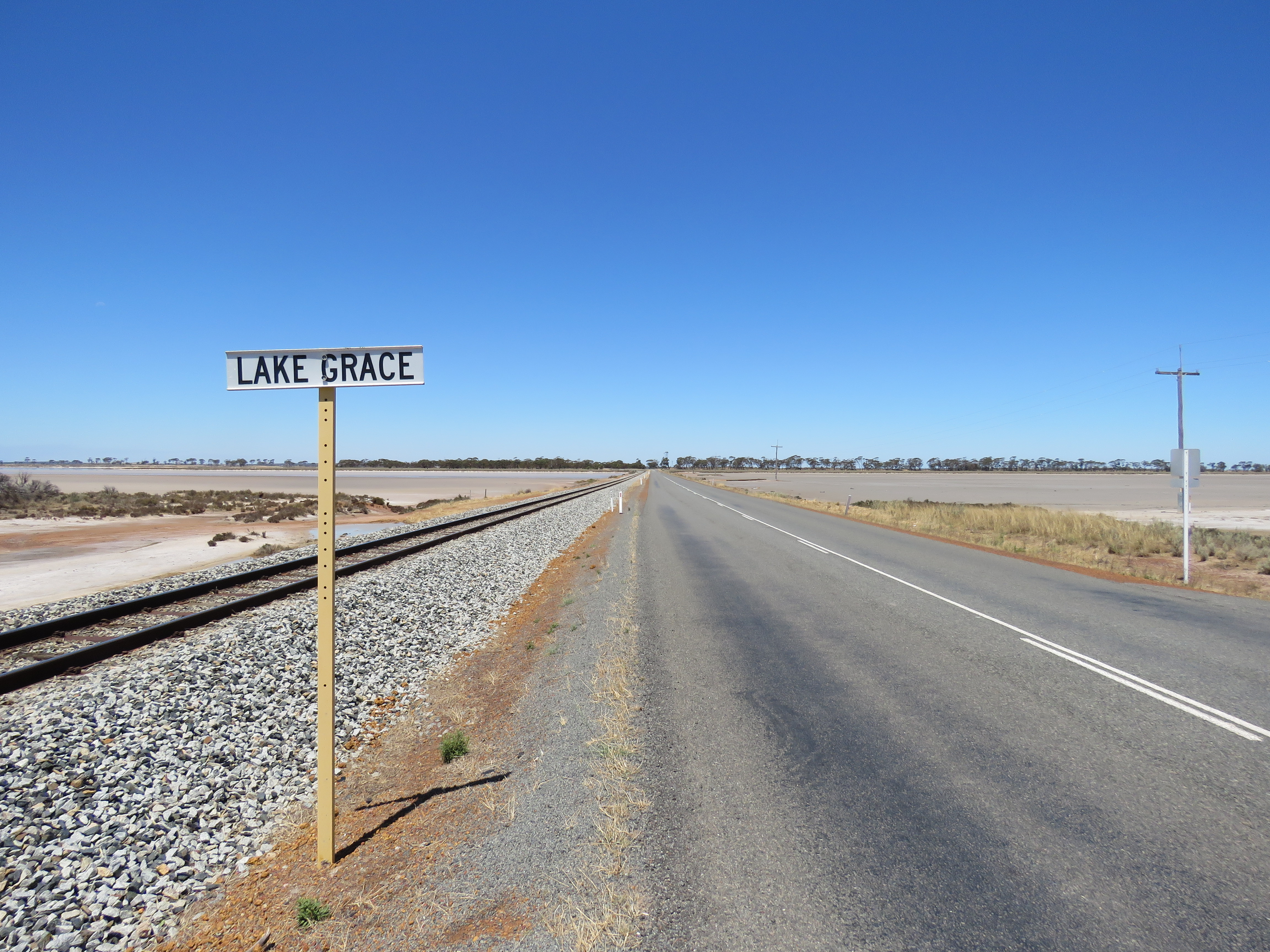
- The Road and rail causeway between Lake Grace South and North, seen from the west

- Location in Western Australia
- Interactive map of Lake Grace North
- Location: Great Southern, Western Australia
- Coordinates: 33°09′S 118°21′E
- Type: Wetland
- Basin countries: Australia
- Surface area: 72 km^{2} (28 sq mi)

Lake Grace North, part of the Lake Grace System, is a wetland in the Great Southern region of Western Australia. Situated in the Shire of Lake Grace, the lake is part of the Western Mallee subregion of the Mallee region of the South West Botanic Province. It has an area of about 7,200 hectares (18,000 acres). It is one of four lakes in the area comprising a DIWA-listed wetland of national importance.

== See also ==
- List of lakes of Australia § Western Australia
