= Fraser Lake (Western Australia) =

Lake in Australia

- Location within Western Australia
- Interactive map of Fraser Lake
- Location: Western Australia, Australia
- Coordinates: 18.03278°S 122.698°E
- Basin countries: Australia

Fraser Lake is a lake in the state of Western Australia, about 1,700 kilometres (1,100 miles) northeast of Perth, the state capital. Fraser Lake is 19 metres (62 ft) above sea level.

Fraser Lake is surrounded primarily by forests.. The area around Fraser Lake is almost unpopulated, with less than two inhabitants per square kilometer. The average annual average is 955 millimeters. The rainiest month is January, with an average of 282 mm rainfall, and the driest is August, with 1 mm rainfall.
