= Pingrup, Western Australia =

Town in the Shire of Kent, Western Australia

Pingrup
- Town
- Interactive map of Pingrup
- Coordinates: 33°32′04″S 118°30′35″E
- Country: Australia
- State: Western Australia
- LGA: Shire of Kent
- Location: 361 km (224 mi) south east of Perth; 48 km (30 mi) south of Lake Grace; 65 km (40 mi) north west of Gnowangerup
- Established: 1924

Government
  - State electorate: Roe
  - Federal division: O'Connor

Area
  - Total: 3,662 km^{2} (1,414 sq mi)
- Elevation: 295 m (968 ft)

Population
  - Total: 231 (SAL 2021)
- Postcode: 6343

Pingrup is a small town and locality in the Great Southern region of Western Australia. It is one of two localities in the Shire of Kent, the other being Nyabing, covering the west of the shire.

At the most recent Australian census, Pingrup had a population of 231 (SAL 2021).

== History ==
Pingrup and the Shire of Kent are located on the traditional land of the Koreng people of the Noongar nation.

The name of the town is Indigenous Australian in origin and was the name of a lake that is close to the townsite. The meaning of Pingrup is most likely taken from A.A. Hassell of Jerramungup (1894) recording of Pingrup (bingerup) meaning place where digging. The Noongar Dictionary gives the meaning for Pingrup as "place where they are digging or have been digging". The name first appeared on charts of the area in 1873.

The townsite came into being as a terminus of the Katanning to Pingrup railway line, which was extended from Nyabing into the area in 1923. The townsite was gazetted in 1924.

The surrounding areas produce wheat and other cereal crops. The town is a receival site for Cooperative Bulk Handling.

On the western border of the locality of Pingrup, on the shore of Lake Chinocup, lays the abandoned townsite of Chinocup.

== Nature reserves ==
The following nature reserves are located within Pingrup. All are located within the Mallee bioregion:

- Chinocup Nature Reserve was gazetted on 20 January 1967 and has a size of 198.25 square kilometres (76.54 mi^{2})
- Chinocup Dam Nature Reserve was gazetted on 7 January 2022 and has a size of 5.8 square kilometres (2.2 mi^{2})
- Cairlocup Nature Reserve was gazetted on 28 October 1966 and has a size of 15.77 square kilometres (6.09 mi^{2})
- Holland Rocks Nature Reserve was gazetted on 15 March 1968 and has a size of 0.5 square kilometres (0.19 mi^{2})
- Lake Bryde Nature Reserve was gazetted on 15 March 1968 and has a size of 16.35 square kilometres (6.31 mi^{2})
- Lake Janet Nature Reserve was gazetted on 15 March 1968 and has a size of 0.32 square kilometres (0.12 mi^{2})
- Lake Magenta Nature Reserve was gazetted on 5 September 1958 and has a size of 1,078.12 square kilometres (416.26 mi^{2})
- Willoughby Nature Reserve was gazetted on 9 October 1964 and has a size of 6.93 square kilometres (2.68 mi^{2})
- WA22966 Nature Reserve was gazetted on 5 August 1949 and has a size of 0.39 square kilometres (0.15 mi^{2})
- WA23218 Nature Reserve was gazetted on 9 March 1951 and has a size of 1.25 square kilometres (0.48 mi^{2})
- WA36967 Nature Reserve was gazetted on 21 November 1980 and has a size of 1.46 square kilometres (0.56 mi^{2})
