= Shire of Kent =

Local government area in the Great Southern region of Western Australia

Coordinates: 33°32′31″S 118°09′00″E

- Local government area
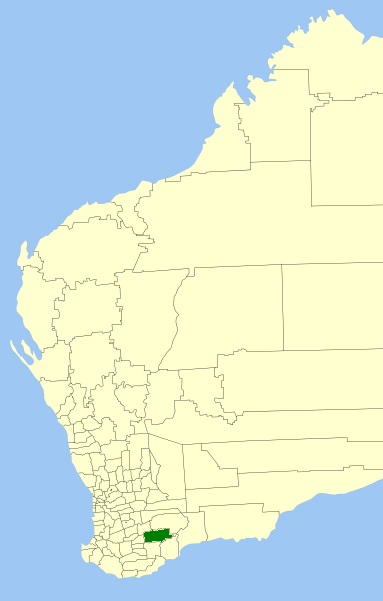
- Location in Western Australia

- Interactive map of Shire of Kent
- Country: Australia
- State: Western Australia
- Region: Great Southern
- Established: 1922
- Council seat: Nyabing

Government
  - Shire President: Kate Johnston
  - State electorate: Roe
  - Federal division: O'Connor

Area
  - Total: 5,633.8 km^{2} (2,175.2 sq mi)

Population
  - Total: 491 (LGA 2021)
- Website: Shire of Kent
LGAs around Shire of Kent
Dumbleyung	Lake Grace	Lake Grace
Katanning	Shire of Kent	Ravensthorpe
Broomehill-T.	Gnowangerup	Jerramungup

The Shire of Kent is a local government area in the Great Southern region of Western Australia, about 320 kilometres (200 mi) southeast of Perth, the state capital. The Shire covers an area of 5,634 square kilometres (2,175 sq mi) and its seat of government is the town of Nyabing. The area produces grains such as wheat, barley and legumes.

== History ==
The Kent Road District was established on 22 December 1922. It was renamed the Nyabing-Pingrup Road District on 10 June 1955.

It was declared a shire as the Shire of Nyabing-Pingrup with effect from 1 July 1961 following the passage of the Local Government Act 1960, which reformed all remaining road districts into shires. It reverted to its previous name of Kent and became the Shire of Kent on 1 December 1972.

The name "Kent" comes from the commissariat officer of Dr T. Wilson’s expedition of 1829.

== Indigenous people ==
The Shire of Kent is located on the traditional land of the Koreng people of the Noongar nation.

== Wards ==
Following a redistribution in 2002, the Shire has been divided into four wards, each with two councillors:

- Holland Rock Ward
- Mindarabin Ward
- Nampup Ward
- Pingarnup Ward

== Towns and localities ==
The towns and localities of the Shire of Kent with population and size figures based on the most recent Australian census:

Locality	Population	Area	Map
Nyabing	260 (SAL 2021)	1,962.5 km^{2} (757.7 sq mi)	
Pingrup	231 (SAL 2021)	3,662 km^{2} (1,414 sq mi)	

== Heritage-listed places ==
As of 2021, 73 places are heritage-listed in the Shire of Kent, of which none are on the State Register of Heritage Places.
