= Nyabing, Western Australia =

Town in the Shire of Kent, Western Australia

Nyabing
- Town
- Coordinates: 33.541°S 118.149°E
- Country: Australia
- State: Western Australia
- LGA(s): Shire of Kent
- Location: 319 km (198 mi) SE of Perth; 46 km (29 mi) SE of Dumbleyung; 57 km (35 mi) E of Katanning
- Established: 1912

Government
  - State electorate(s): Roe
  - Federal division(s): O'Connor

Area
  - Total: 1,962.5 km^{2} (757.7 sq mi)
- Elevation: 325 m (1,066 ft)

Population
  - Total(s): 260 (SAL 2021)
- Postcode: 6341

Nyabing is a small town and locality in the Great Southern region of Western Australia. The name is of Aboriginal origin and is thought to derive from the Aboriginal word "ne-yameng", which is the name of an everlasting flower Rhodanthe manglesii. It is one of two localities in the Shire of Kent, the other being Pingrup, covering the east of the shire.

== History ==
Nyabing and the Shire of Kent are located on the traditional land of the Koreng people of the Noongar nation.

The first Europeans to visit the area were sandalwood cutters, and the first lease taken in the area was by settler John Hassell in 1873.

The townsite was planned in 1911 as part of the Great Southern Railway; the name given to the siding was Nampup. The name Nampup is also Aboriginal in origin and is the name of a local soak. Lots were surveyed later in the year and the town was gazetted in 1912. The name was changed later that year after several complaints that Nampup was too similar to Nannup; the town was renamed to Nyabing.

The town became a stop on the Katanning to Pingrup railway line when it opened as far Nyabing in 1912 and was extended to Pingrup in 1923.

The surrounding areas produce wheat and other cereal crops. The town is a receival site for Cooperative Bulk Handling.

Along the Katanning-Nyabing Road, two other town sites exist within the locality, Kwobrup and Moornaming, both located west of the townsite of Nyabing. Both townsites were originally established as railway sidings.

== Nature reserves ==
The following nature reserves are located within Nyabing. All are located within the Mallee bioregion:

- Chinocup Dam Nature Reserve was gazetted on 7 January 2022 and has a size of 5.8 square kilometres (2.2 sq mi)
- Corneecup Nature Reserve was gazetted on 9 November 1956 and has a size of 19.52 square kilometres (7.54 sq mi)
- McDougall Nature Reserve was gazetted on 20 July 1962 and has a size of 3.36 square kilometres (1.30 sq mi)
- Moornaming Nature Reserve was gazetted on 2 December 1983 and has a size of 0.78 square kilometres (0.30 sq mi)
- WA19080 Nature Reserve was gazetted on 1 January 1901 and has a size of 0.8 square kilometres (0.31 sq mi)
- WA19081 Nature Reserve was gazetted on 15 March 1991 and has a size of 1.34 square kilometres (0.52 sq mi)
- WA20046 Nature Reserve was gazetted on 1 March 1929 and has a size of 3.91 square kilometres (1.51 sq mi)
- WA24827 Nature Reserve was gazetted on 11 October 1957 and has a size of 0.49 square kilometres (0.19 sq mi)
- WA32663 Nature Reserve was gazetted on 28 June 1974 and has a size of 3.22 square kilometres (1.24 sq mi)
- WA49706 Nature Reserve was gazetted on 18 July 2008 and has a size of 1.45 square kilometres (0.56 sq mi)
