= List of named nature reserves of Western Australia =

Nature reserves in Western Australia

Western Australia, as of 2022, has 1,233 nature reserves, of which 826 are named and 407 unnamed. At the time of the last two-yearly Collaborative Australian Protected Areas Database report in 2022, 10,074,297 hectares (24,894,130 acres) of land in Western Australia was covered by nature reserves, which is 13.23 percent of all protected areas in the state and 3.99 percent of the state overall. Overall, just over 30 percent of Western Australia is covered by protected areas.

== Nature reserves list ==
Name	IUCN	Gazetted area (hectare)	Declared	Coordinates	IBRA
Adele Island Nature Reserve	Ia	217	1 December 2000	15°30′40″S 123°09′25″E	NOK
Airlie Island Nature Reserve	Ia	41	27 November 1987	21°19′22″S 115°10′02″E	PIL
Alco Nature Reserve	Ia	191	27 July 1973	34°07′43″S 116°08′39″E	JAF
Alexander Nature Reserve	Ia	807	20 December 1963	33°50′42″S 122°47′30″E	ESP
Alfred Cove Nature Reserve	Ia	9	9 December 1977	32°01′08″S 115°48′22″E	SWA
Amery Nature Reserve	Ia	36	30 March 1984	31°09′08″S 117°05′39″E	AVW
Anderson Lake Nature Reserve	Ia	479	5 December 1958	34°10′21″S 117°57′52″E	MAL
Arpenteur Nature Reserve	Ia	89	4 July 1980	34°53′10″S 118°24′53″E	ESP
Arthur River Nature Reserve	Ia	3,248	17 May 1963	33°03′53″S 117°21′25″E	AVW, JAF
Austin Bay Nature Reserve	Ia	1,659	21 January 1898	32°37′36″S 115°45′11″E	SWA
Badjaling Nature Reserve	Ia	241	12 June 1953	31°59′21″S 117°30′24″E	AVW
Badjaling North Nature Reserve	Ia	58	30 March 1906	31°58′42″S 117°29′30″E	AVW
Badjaling West Nature Reserve	Ia	56	14 October 1966	32°00′12″S 117°28′44″E	AVW
Bakers Junction Nature Reserve	Ia	1,087	7 August 1970	34°54′34″S 117°56′28″E	JAF
Baladjie Lake Nature Reserve	Ia	8,916	15 June 1993	30°56′13″S 118°51′49″E	AVW, COO
Balannup Lake Nature Reserve	Ia	6	10 June 1891	32°06′49″S 115°56′38″E	SWA
Bald Island Nature Reserve	Ia	809	3 March 1961	34°55′14″S 118°28′05″E	ESP
Balicup Lake Nature Reserve	Ia	687	21 December 1923	34°15′53″S 117°47′03″E	AVW
Balkuling Nature Reserve	Ia	12	10 June 1955	31°51′15″S 117°06′23″E	AVW
Ballast Pit Nature Reserve	Ia	12	30 January 1931	33°35′12″S 118°03′01″E	MAL
Bambanup Nature Reserve	Ia	101	26 April 1963	31°25′30″S 115°53′24″E	SWA
Banksia Nature Reserve	Ia	33	8 July 1966	32°15′16″S 115°53′21″E	SWA
Barbalin Nature Reserve	Ia	176	22 December 1972	30°53′08″S 118°06′24″E	AVW
Barlee Range Nature Reserve	Ia	104,544	31 May 1963	23°11′57″S 115°56′15″E	GAS
Barrabarra Nature Reserve	Ia	929	14 October 1966	28°37′28″S 115°57′29″E	AVW
Barracca Nature Reserve	Ia	17	19 April 1918	31°31′20″S 116°01′40″E	SWA
Barrow Island Nature Reserve	Ia	23,483	27 November 1908	20°48′16″S 115°23′37″E	CAR
Bartletts Well Nature Reserve	Ia	117	19 May 1887	31°09′48″S 115°48′36″E	SWA
Bartram Nature Reserve	Ia	58	9 March 1928	32°22′55″S 116°43′58″E	JAF
Bashford Nature Reserve	Ia	101	4 October 1985	30°53′17″S 115°23′06″E	SWA
Basil Road Nature Reserve	Ia	1,162	3 May 1968	34°38′14″S 118°37′30″E	ESP
Beaufort Bridge Nature Reserve	Ia	148	23 September 1890	33°30′07″S 117°03′44″E	JAF
Beaumont Nature Reserve	Ia	11,759	29 June 1973	33°30′38″S 122°36′43″E	ESP, MAL
Bebenorin Nature Reserve	Ia	20	23 August 1974	33°38′44″S 122°56′07″E	ESP
Bedout Island Nature Reserve	Ia	31	31 December 1975	19°35′18″S 119°05′58″E	PIL
Beebeegnying Nature Reserve	Ia	143	19 July 1963	30°38′08″S 117°55′14″E	AVW
Beechina Nature Reserve	Ia	65	4 December 1970	31°51′16″S 116°19′00″E	JAF
Beechina North Nature Reserve	Ia	24	11 December 1970	31°50′34″S 116°18′50″E	JAF
Beejenup Nature Reserve	Ia	50	23 October 1970	34°14′36″S 117°50′16″E	AVW, ESP
Beekeepers Nature Reserve	Ia	66,277	6 July 1956	29°42′20″S 115°02′41″E	GES, SWA
Beetalyinna Nature Reserve	Ia	206	15 September 1892	28°47′37″S 115°03′45″E	GES
Bella Vista Nature Reserve	Ia	69	5 June 1987	28°32′14″S 114°40′32″E	GES
Bendering Nature Reserve	Ia	1,895	24 June 1960	32°23′21″S 118°22′29″E	MAL
Benger Swamp Nature Reserve	Ia	578	26 August 1977	33°10′22″S 115°50′11″E	SWA
Bernier and Dorre Islands Nature Reserve	IV	9,720	6 December 1957	25°06′47″S 113°05′55″E	YAL
Bessieres Island Nature Reserve	Ia	55	1 December 2000	21°31′32″S 114°45′44″E	CAR
Betts Nature Reserve	Ia	25	17 May 1985	31°09′30″S 116°03′10″E	JAF
Bewmalling Nature Reserve	Ia	38	17 April 1970	31°20′37″S 116°24′50″E	JAF
Biglin Nature Reserve	Ia	6	22 May 1964	32°30′01″S 118°42′50″E	MAL
Biljahnie Rock Nature Reserve	Ia	1,036	15 August 1969	31°18′46″S 119°52′01″E	COO
Billericay Nature Reserve	Ia	239	8 June 1979	32°16′45″S 118°19′29″E	MAL
Billyacatting Hill Nature Reserve	Ia	2,063	1 July 1921	31°03′50″S 118°00′44″E	AVW
Biluny Wells Nature Reserve	Ia	22,852	3 February 2021	29°51′03″S 117°01′53″E	AVW
Binaronca Nature Reserve	Ia	186	28 June 1974	31°42′13″S 121°41′32″E	COO
Bindoo Hill Nature Reserve	Ia	649	12 October 1956	28°29′43″S 115°13′38″E	GES
Bindoon Spring Nature Reserve	Ia	39	24 January 1896	31°23′53″S 116°21′05″E	JAF
Birdwhistle Nature Reserve	Ia	396	15 September 1950	32°52′18″S 117°29′42″E	AVW
Birdwood Nature Reserve	Ia	46	18 February 1966	33°41′17″S 117°14′24″E	JAF
Bishops Nature Reserve	Ia	1,404	15 March 1968	33°18′19″S 121°33′51″E	MAL
Blue Gum Creek Nature Reserve	Ia	85	4 November 1927	34°50′24″S 117°33′46″E	JAF
Blue Well Nature Reserve	Ia	29	11 July 1913	28°16′50″S 114°46′24″E	GES
Bobakine Nature Reserve	Ia	272	12 July 1994	31°40′03″S 116°31′56″E	JAF
Bockaring Nature Reserve	Ia	91	31 March 1905	33°23′00″S 117°28′18″E	AVW
Bokan Nature Reserve	Ia	520	25 January 1907	32°59′04″S 117°31′42″E	AVW
Bokarup Nature Reserve	Ia	146	2 May 1913	34°20′05″S 116°49′57″E	JAF
Bon Accord Road Nature Reserve	Ia	10	4 September 1970	34°56′03″S 117°55′39″E	JAF
Boodadong Nature Reserve	Ia	40	26 August 1927	31°10′21″S 116°23′40″E	JAF
Boodie, Double Middle Islands Nature Reserve	Ia	587	13 April 1984	20°54′43″S 115°19′36″E	CAR, PIL
Boolading Nature Reserve	Ia	163	21 April 1961	33°21′09″S 116°37′33″E	JAF
Boolanelling Nature Reserve	Ia	669	30 April 1948	32°06′53″S 117°47′12″E	AVW
Boonadgin Nature Reserve	Ia	202	28 September 1934	32°36′27″S 116°57′28″E	AVW
Boonanarring Nature Reserve	Ia	9,250	9 August 1991	31°12′32″S 115°53′42″E	SWA
Booraan Nature Reserve	Ia	480	18 April 1969	31°27′40″S 118°27′03″E	AVW
Boothendarra Nature Reserve	Ia	2,075	5 November 1965	30°16′13″S 115°39′26″E	GES
Bootine Nature Reserve	Ia	71	5 August 1997	31°14′54″S 115°44′53″E	SWA
Boullanger, Whitlock, Favourite, Tern and Osprey Islands Nature Reserve	Ia	40	9 August 1968	30°19′05″S 114°59′56″E	SWA
Boundain Nature Reserve	Ia	289	28 July 1933	32°55′09″S 117°21′22″E	AVW
Bowgada Nature Reserve	Ia	152	11 April 1969	29°20′09″S 116°10′03″E	AVW
Bowgarder Nature Reserve	Ia	1,170	25 September 1987	29°14′36″S 116°22′09″E	AVW
Boyagin Nature Reserve	Ia	4,966	24 January 1908	32°28′18″S 116°52′49″E	AVW
Boyermucking Nature Reserve	Ia	36	14 May 1909	32°28′49″S 117°31′59″E	AVW
Bradford Nature Reserve	Ia	95	20 September 1912	32°54′07″S 117°02′17″E	AVW
Breakaway Ridge Nature Reserve	Ia	3,323	15 March 1968	33°13′27″S 118°55′08″E	MAL
Breaksea Island Nature Reserve	Ia	104	25 June 1965	35°03′48″S 118°03′16″E	JAF
Breera Road Nature Reserve	Ia	108	4 February 2004	31°26′57″S 115°57′48″E	SWA
Broadwater Nature Reserve	Ia	80	20 December 1963	33°40′19″S 115°17′09″E	SWA
Brooks Nature Reserve	Ia	22	25 June 1915	32°51′27″S 117°31′59″E	AVW
Brookton Highway Nature Reserve	Ia	421	12 September 1980	32°24′10″S 116°43′15″E	JAF
Broomehill Nature Reserve	Ia	10	20 December 1918	33°53′05″S 117°41′44″E	AVW
Browse Island Nature Reserve	Ia	14	26 September 1947	14°06′33″S 123°32′56″E	ITI
Bruce Rock Nature Reserve	Ia	40	13 August 1909	31°52′15″S 118°10′08″E	AVW
Buchanan Nature Reserve	Ia	129	18 March 1932	33°05′46″S 117°33′14″E	AVW
Bugin Nature Reserve	Ia	26	14 October 1966	32°05′09″S 117°23′35″E	AVW
Bulgin Nature Reserve	Ia	24	14 November 1975	31°39′26″S 117°05′09″E	AVW
Buller Nature Reserve	Ia	301	4 October 1940	32°52′50″S 115°49′47″E	SWA
Bullsbrook Nature Reserve	Ia	120	7 June 1901	31°37′35″S 116°01′12″E	SWA
Bundarra Nature Reserve	Ia	213	30 April 1954	30°55′36″S 115°49′27″E	SWA
Bungulla Nature Reserve	Ia	24	15 April 1976	31°37′33″S 117°35′30″E	AVW
Buntine Nature Reserve	Ia	1,919	31 May 1963	30°00′06″S 116°38′22″E	AVW
Burdett Nature Reserve	Ia	71	18 March 1966	33°28′53″S 122°14′11″E	ESP, MAL
Burdett North Nature Reserve	Ia	812	25 February 1966	33°29′28″S 122°11′09″E	MAL
Burdett South Nature Reserve	Ia	4,467	18 February 1966	33°32′18″S 122°12′13″E	ESP, MAL
Burges Spring Nature Reserve	Ia	94	2 May 1882	31°28′46″S 117°41′18″E	AVW
Burgess Well Nature Reserve	Ia	68	10 March 1916	27°57′14″S 114°44′33″E	GES
Burma Road Nature Reserve	Ia	6,890	15 March 1963	28°56′30″S 115°06′44″E	GES
Burnside and Simpson Island Nature Reserve	Ia	115	15 June 1993	22°06′15″S 114°30′35″E	CAR
Burracoppin Nature Reserve	Ia	202	19 January 1923	31°24′39″S 118°30′20″E	AVW
Burroloo Well Nature Reserve	Ia	11	29 April 1873	31°26′50″S 116°04′03″E	JAF
Bushfire Rock Nature Reserve	Ia	115	13 December 1968	32°26′30″S 119°21′01″E	MAL
Byrd Swamp Nature Reserve	Ia	41	6 July 1894	33°06′20″S 115°48′23″E	SWA
Cairlocup Nature Reserve	Ia	1,577	28 October 1966	33°43′50″S 118°44′27″E	MAL
Cairn Nature Reserve	Ia	720	16 June 1905	31°50′36″S 118°50′53″E	AVW
Calcaling Nature Reserve	Ia	170	30 September 1910	30°51′43″S 118°21′24″E	AVW
Camel Lake Nature Reserve	Ia	3,215	12 January 1962	34°17′30″S 118°00′26″E	ESP
Camerer Nature Reserve	Ia	171	22 January 1993	31°16′19″S 116°22′07″E	JAF
Canna Nature Reserve	Ia	253	30 August 1968	28°53′33″S 115°50′18″E	AVW
Capamauro Nature Reserve	Ia	4,686	11 January 1957	29°53′25″S 115°54′34″E	AVW, GES
Capel Nature Reserve	Ia	94	24 September 1915	33°34′33″S 115°32′44″E	SWA
Capercup Road North Nature Reserve	Ia	146	4 February 1972	33°31′20″S 116°44′02″E	JAF
Cardunia Rocks Nature Reserve	Ia	29	24 January 1986	30°55′46″S 122°33′59″E	COO
Cardup Nature Reserve	Ia	75	23 March 1894	32°14′46″S 115°59′20″E	SWA
Carlyarn Nature Reserve	Ia	2,723	6 April 1962	30°03′07″S 117°27′41″E	AVW
Carmody Nature Reserve	Ia	287	17 May 1963	33°00′07″S 117°26′37″E	AVW
Carnac Island Nature Reserve	Ia	22	8 March 1963	32°07′18″S 115°39′46″E	SWA
Caron Nature Reserve	Ia	291	17 May 1963	29°36′02″S 116°19′50″E	AVW
Carrabin Nature Reserve	Ia	760	10 December 1915	31°23′43″S 118°39′58″E	AVW
Carribin Rock Nature Reserve	Ia	23	25 October 1907	31°21′21″S 117°29′23″E	AVW
Carrolup Nature Reserve	Ia	30	21 June 1901	33°41′34″S 117°21′49″E	AVW, JAF
Cartamulligan Well Nature Reserve	Ia	18	2 October 1884	31°29′35″S 116°45′18″E	AVW
Cascade Nature Reserve	Ia	384	2 February 1973	33°28′58″S 121°06′54″E	MAL
Casuarina Nature Reserve	Ia	196	20 October 1892	33°20′06″S 117°21′43″E	AVW
Chandala Nature Reserve	Ia	146	13 February 1981	31°29′35″S 115°57′08″E	SWA
Charles Gardner Reserve Nature Reserve	Ia	799	1 March 1929	31°47′02″S 117°29′14″E	AVW
Chatham Island Nature Reserve	Ia	100	30 March 1973	35°01′53″S 116°29′53″E	WAR
Cheadanup Nature Reserve	Ia	7,139	2 February 1973	33°30′23″S 120°40′04″E	ESP, MAL
Cherry Tree Pool Nature Reserve	Ia	6	21 July 1905	33°42′31″S 117°16′04″E	JAF
Chester Nature Reserve	Ia	372	8 December 2004	34°10′56″S 115°21′45″E	JAF
Cheyne Island Nature Reserve	Ia	20	29 August 1913	34°35′37″S 118°46′00″E	ESP
Cheyne Road Nature Reserve	Ia	367	26 March 1964	34°48′31″S 118°17′26″E	ESP, JAF
Chiddarcooping Nature Reserve	Ia	5,262	23 April 1926	30°54′12″S 118°39′27″E	AVW
Chilimony Nature Reserve	Ia	146	30 October 1903	28°06′10″S 114°33′50″E	GES
Chillinup Nature Reserve	Ia	330	31 July 1959	34°32′21″S 118°04′16″E	ESP
Chinamans Pool Nature Reserve	Ia	27	21 July 1972	24°51′38″S 113°40′20″E	CAR
Chinocup Nature Reserve	Ia	19,825	20 January 1967	33°14′34″S 118°23′33″E	MAL
Chinocup Dam Nature Reserve	Ia	580	7 January 2022	33°33′05″S 118°20′31″E	MAL
Chirelillup Nature Reserve	Ia	64	25 February 1910	33°58′00″S 118°06′29″E	MAL
Chittering Lakes Nature Reserve	Ia	322	11 December 1968	31°25′35″S 116°05′23″E	JAF
Chorkerup Nature Reserve	Ia	48	26 August 2004	34°47′25″S 117°41′11″E	JAF
Clackline Nature Reserve	Ia	703	21 December 1973	31°42′11″S 116°29′26″E	JAF
Claypit Nature Reserve	Ia	91	6 September 1912	32°47′45″S 117°26′05″E	AVW
Clear and Muddy Lakes Nature Reserve	Ia	1,926	25 January 1901	30°25′16″S 120°50′45″E	COO
Clyde Hill Nature Reserve	Ia	1,671	18 November 1983	33°21′05″S 122°58′57″E	MAL
Cobertup Nature Reserve	Ia	151	5 April 1963	34°27′18″S 116°49′56″E	JAF
Coblinine Nature Reserve	Ia	4,167	4 September 1908	33°24′50″S 117°45′45″E	AVW
Commodine Nature Reserve	Ia	145	7 July 1933	32°47′15″S 117°18′25″E	AVW
Concaring Nature Reserve	Ia	85	13 June 1932	33°06′20″S 117°34′27″E	AVW
Condarnin Rock Nature Reserve	Ia	259	27 June 1969	31°19′11″S 119°40′18″E	COO
Cookinbin Nature Reserve	Ia	377	15 September 1972	31°00′47″S 118°14′03″E	AVW
Coolinup Nature Reserve	Ia	216	18 December 1964	33°43′51″S 122°18′21″E	ESP
Coomallo Nature Reserve	Ia	8,807	15 November 1991	30°12′59″S 115°19′32″E	GES
Coomelberrup Nature Reserve	Ia	92	13 January 1922	33°24′15″S 117°47′00″E	AVW
Cootayerup Nature Reserve	Ia	40	16 July 1915	34°11′46″S 116°53′14″E	JAF
Copley Dale Nature Reserve	Ia	5	5 May 1961	31°41′03″S 116°09′13″E	JAF
Corackerup Nature Reserve	Ia	4,334	17 May 1963	34°11′47″S 118°39′49″E	ESP
Corneecup Nature Reserve	Ia	1,952	9 November 1956	33°40′48″S 118°16′35″E	MAL
Coulomb Point Nature Reserve	Ia	28,676	26 September 1969	17°17′43″S 122°16′52″E	DAL
Cowerup Nature Reserve	Ia	270	11 July 1975	34°24′56″S 116°40′53″E	JAF
Coyrecup Nature Reserve	Ia	1,147	28 April 1967	33°42′32″S 117°50′03″E	AVW, MAL
Craig Nature Reserve	Ia	11	25 June 1971	31°46′01″S 117°44′18″E	AVW
Crampton Nature Reserve	Ia	37	6 July 1956	33°01′23″S 115°44′26″E	SWA
Creery Island Nature Reserve	Ia	74	20 December 1963	32°33′50″S 115°43′37″E	SWA
Cronin Nature Reserve	Ia	263	18 March 1932	33°12′32″S 117°40′19″E	AVW
Crooks Nature Reserve	Ia	585	15 June 1973	32°50′12″S 118°44′40″E	MAL
Culbin Nature Reserve	Ia	45	21 September 1990	33°10′05″S 116°50′24″E	JAF
Cullen Nature Reserve	Ia	1	28 January 1972	31°52′52″S 116°33′47″E	JAF
Cutubury Nature Reserve	Ia	15	6 October 1967	28°45′22″S 114°43′02″E	GES
Dalyup Nature Reserve	Ia	57	23 September 1927	33°42′54″S 121°35′04″E	ESP
Damboring Nature Reserve	Ia	667	15 July 1983	30°31′32″S 116°41′37″E	AVW
Damnosa Nature Reserve	Ia	47	20 April 1956	33°05′00″S 119°39′57″E	MAL
Dangin Nature Reserve	Ia	4	24 June 1927	32°00′29″S 117°18′48″E	AVW
Danjinning Nature Reserve	Ia	405	17 November 1978	30°36′36″S 118°04′07″E	AVW
Dattening Nature Reserve	Ia	23	30 June 1967	32°32′14″S 116°52′48″E	AVW
De La Poer Range Nature Reserve	Ia	74,935	13 September 1991	27°24′08″S 122°42′19″E	GVD, MUR
Dead Mans Swamp Nature Reserve	Ia	125	27 March 1908	33°30′16″S 116°57′23″E	JAF
Depot Hill Nature Reserve	Ia	63	4 March 1966	29°45′33″S 115°22′45″E	GES
Derdibin Rock Nature Reserve	Ia	133	4 March 1977	31°20′37″S 117°21′07″E	AVW
Dingerlin Nature Reserve	Ia	63	20 February 1914	32°53′22″S 117°36′32″E	AVW
Dingo Rock Nature Reserve	Ia	63	16 June 1911	30°51′43″S 116°58′20″E	AVW
Dingo Well Nature Reserve	Ia	131	12 December 1913	31°13′44″S 117°16′44″E	AVW
Dongara Nature Reserve	Ia	52	19 September 1952	29°13′42″S 114°55′03″E	GES
Dongolocking Nature Reserve	Ia	2,535	18 March 1932	33°10′01″S 117°38′40″E	AVW
Donnelly River Nature Reserve	Ia	57	12 February 1932	34°12′34″S 115°56′47″E	WAR
Donnybrook Boyup Brook Road Nature Reserve	Ia	2	19 January 1912	33°43′57″S 116°18′40″E	JAF
Dookanooka Nature Reserve	Ia	300	16 June 1911	29°35′32″S 115°38′14″E	AVW, GES
Dordie Rocks Nature Reserve	II	120	17 January 1896	31°35′28″S 121°35′57″E	COO
Doubtful Islands Nature Reserve	Ia	130	6 June 1952	34°22′32″S 119°36′23″E	ESP
Doutha Soak Nature Reserve	Ia	17	6 March 1931	28°54′07″S 116°03′52″E	AVW
Dowak Nature Reserve	Ia	81	24 April 1980	32°53′21″S 121°35′56″E	MAL
Down Road Nature Reserve	Ia	777	7 October 1932	34°57′39″S 117°45′04″E	JAF
Dragon Rocks Nature Reserve	Ia	32,204	22 June 1979	32°47′16″S 119°00′24″E	MAL
Dragon Tree Soak Nature Reserve	Ia	17,729	30 March 1979	19°41′25″S 123°20′35″E	GSD
Drummond Nature Reserve	Ia	439	24 August 1993	31°18′58″S 116°24′23″E	JAF
Dukin Nature Reserve	Ia	333	22 February 1918	30°57′08″S 117°24′47″E	AVW
Duladgin Nature Reserve	Ia	1,560	19 January 1893	31°10′15″S 119°40′01″E	COO
Dulbelling Nature Reserve	Ia	53	25 October 1907	32°05′35″S 117°14′20″E	AVW
Dulbining Nature Reserve	Ia	588	17 March 1905	32°54′13″S 117°37′16″E	AVW
Dumbleyung Lake Nature Reserve	Ia	4,208	15 March 1963	33°22′40″S 117°38′47″E	AVW
Dundas Nature Reserve	Ia	780,883	13 February 1981	32°24′18″S 122°43′26″E	COO, MAL
Dundas Road Nature Reserve	Ia	1	18 December 2017	31°59′02″S 115°59′13″E	SWA
Dunn Rock Nature Reserve	Ia	27,349	18 January 1980	33°19′35″S 119°28′45″E	ESP, MAL
Durokoppin Nature Reserve	Ia	1,030	29 April 1949	31°24′35″S 117°45′49″E	AVW
East Collanilling Nature Reserve	Ia	158	18 March 1932	33°09′33″S 117°37′33″E	AVW
East Latham Nature Reserve	Ia	121	21 February 1913	29°46′06″S 116°34′49″E	AVW
East Naernup Nature Reserve	Ia	825	2 February 1973	33°40′03″S 120°47′10″E	ESP
East Nugadong Nature Reserve	Ia	781	21 February 1930	30°11′46″S 116°53′39″E	AVW
East Wallambin Nature Reserve	Ia	40	17 July 1914	30°58′44″S 117°44′08″E	AVW
East Yorkrakine Nature Reserve	Ia	78	19 May 1950	31°22′54″S 117°39′49″E	AVW
East Yornaning Nature Reserve	Ia	248	24 July 1925	32°44′49″S 117°22′13″E	AVW
East Yuna Nature Reserve	Ia	1,739	5 July 1968	28°25′46″S 115°12′32″E	GES
Eastbrook Nature Reserve	Ia	43	6 November 1964	34°24′41″S 116°05′59″E	WAR
Eaton Nature Reserve	Ia	44	15 June 1923	31°22′14″S 117°00′23″E	AVW
Eclipse Island Nature Reserve	Ia	99	1 December 2000	35°10′54″S 117°53′05″E	WAR
Elashgin Nature Reserve	Ia	259	25 October 1907	31°19′59″S 117°26′41″E	AVW
Ellen Brook Nature Reserve	Ia	80	30 September 1966	31°45′12″S 116°02′02″E	SWA
Elliot Nature Reserve	Ia	45	12 April 1918	31°06′27″S 117°33′32″E	AVW
Elphin Nature Reserve	Ia	198	2 December 1960	30°51′40″S 116°41′08″E	AVW
Emu Hill Nature Reserve	Ia	76	11 July 1958	32°06′30″S 118°22′07″E	AVW
Eneminga Nature Reserve	Ia	741	31 December 1964	30°48′54″S 115°31′18″E	GES, SWA
Eradu Nature Reserve	Ia	63	15 September 1892	28°43′24″S 115°02′29″E	GES
Erangy Spring Nature Reserve	Ia	61	14 August 1981	28°51′14″S 115°15′34″E	GES
Errina Road Nature Reserve	Ia	11	29 November 2018	31°49′38″S 115°51′32″E	SWA
Escape Island Nature Reserve	Ia	27	1 December 2000	30°20′00″S 114°59′06″E	SWA
Falls Brook Nature Reserve	Ia	374	21 May 1948	33°04′10″S 115°59′45″E	JAF
Faunadale Nature Reserve	Ia	85	20 November 1914	34°13′42″S 116°06′53″E	JAF, WAR
Fields Nature Reserve	Ia	1,179	2 February 1973	33°27′31″S 121°13′53″E	MAL
Fish Road Nature Reserve	Ia	23	19 October 1951	33°43′53″S 115°23′22″E	SWA
Flagstaff Nature Reserve	Ia	424	4 June 1965	33°29′30″S 117°16′13″E	AVW
Flat Rock Nature Reserve	Ia	1,468	17 December 1965	32°39′46″S 118°52′17″E	MAL
Flat Rock Gully Nature Reserve	Ia	386	1 December 1939	31°23′48″S 116°24′46″E	JAF
Flinders Bay Nature Reserve	Ia	3	11 April 1986	34°24′52″S 115°12′22″E	WAR
Flowery Patch Nature Reserve	Ia	20	2 May 1882	31°28′05″S 117°18′57″E	AVW
Folly Nature Reserve	Ia	8	19 February 1915	31°17′33″S 117°30′36″E	AVW
Formby Nature Reserve	Ia	38	16 September 1904	34°18′01″S 118°04′17″E	ESP
Forrestdale Lake Nature Reserve	Ia	246	16 August 1957	32°09′32″S 115°56′14″E	SWA
Fourteen Mile Brook Nature Reserve	Ia	45	1 April 1938	32°49′54″S 117°05′46″E	AVW
Fowler Gully Nature Reserve	Ia	230	23 April 1993	30°51′36″S 116°37′42″E	AVW
Freycinet, Double Islands etc Nature Reserve	Ia	205	28 July 1961	26°32′20″S 113°46′05″E	CAR, YAL
Frog Rock Nature Reserve	Ia	1,438	11 October 1929	31°28′50″S 119°13′49″E	AVW
Gabbin Nature Reserve	Ia	83	5 April 1917	30°47′29″S 117°40′49″E	AVW
Gabwotting Nature Reserve	Ia	16	27 October 1911	31°10′13″S 117°29′46″E	AVW
Gagarlagu Nature Reserve	Ia	15,702	4 January 2021	28°36′54″S 118°08′40″E	MUR
Galamup Nature Reserve	Ia	222	24 February 1899	34°26′31″S 116°46′16″E	JAF
Galena Nature Reserve	Ia	217	20 December 1963	27°52′29″S 114°42′52″E	GES
Gathercole Nature Reserve	Ia	142	9 May 1930	30°54′46″S 116°47′49″E	AVW
Geekabee Hill Nature Reserve	Ia	4	2 July 1971	34°18′44″S 117°23′47″E	JAF
Geeraning Nature Reserve	Ia	677	30 November 1951	30°31′44″S 118°36′01″E	COO
Gibbs Road Nature Reserve	Ia	9	10 August 2006	32°09′08″S 115°54′57″E	SWA
Gibson Desert Nature Reserve	Ia	1,842,864	22 April 1977	24°54′56″S 125°30′05″E	GID
Gill Nature Reserve	Ia	40	3 February 1998	34°31′43″S 117°24′40″E	JAF
Gillingarra Nature Reserve	Ia	105	20 July 1893	30°56′33″S 116°02′28″E	JAF
Gingilup Swamps Nature Reserve	Ia	4,326	30 October 1970	34°19′55″S 115°28′16″E	WAR
Gingin Stock Route Nature Reserve	Ia	50	15 July 1977	31°19′46″S 115°37′07″E	SWA
Glasse Island Nature Reserve	Ia	4	30 March 1973	34°25′19″S 119°24′42″E	ESP
Gledhow Nature Reserve	Ia	4	11 March 1898	35°00′37″S 117°50′03″E	JAF
Glenluce Nature Reserve	Ia	244	4 May 1962	31°47′55″S 117°40′32″E	AVW
Gnandaroo Island Nature Reserve	Ia	3	27 March 1975	21°57′24″S 114°31′19″E	CAR
Gnarkaryelling Nature Reserve	Ia	17	12 May 1905	33°16′03″S 117°33′46″E	AVW
Goegrup Lake Nature Reserve	Ia	320	20 July 1962	32°31′08″S 115°46′54″E	SWA
Goodenough Nature Reserve	Ia	71	1 September 1899	32°29′21″S 117°06′48″E	AVW
Goodlands Nature Reserve	Ia	1,349	4 June 1965	29°59′19″S 117°22′47″E	AVW
Gorge Rock Nature Reserve	Ia	28	1 June 1917	32°27′31″S 118°00′25″E	MAL
Granite Hill Nature Reserve	Ia	127	3 June 1988	34°42′21″S 118°03′03″E	JAF
Great Victoria Desert Nature Reserve	Ia	2,417,201	21 August 1970	29°39′12″S 128°10′34″E	GVD, NUL
Greaves Road Nature Reserve	Ia	251	5 September 1919	34°16′54″S 118°31′01″E	ESP
Green Island Nature Reserve	Ia	2	6 September 1957	34°59′09″S 117°57′07″E	JAF
Greenbushes Nature Reserve	Ia	399	8 December 2004	33°50′29″S 115°56′37″E	JAF
Griffiths Nature Reserve	Ia	5,418	16 October 1970	33°20′19″S 121°02′10″E	MAL
Gundaring Nature Reserve	Ia	127	28 February 1908	31°51′06″S 117°37′31″E	AVW
Gundaring Lake Nature Reserve	Ia	316	24 February 1955	33°17′52″S 117°29′35″E	AVW
Gunyidi Nature Reserve	Ia	121	19 September 1952	30°10′59″S 116°02′19″E	GES
Gwalia Nature Reserve	Ia	968	28 July 2021	33°08′51″S 115°46′30″E	SWA
Haag Nature Reserve	Ia	9	16 January 1981	33°42′57″S 115°07′48″E	SWA
Haddleton Nature Reserve	Ia	1,161	30 March 1973	33°35′48″S 116°36′54″E	JAF
Haddleton Springs Nature Reserve	Ia	40	25 May 1928	33°37′17″S 116°35′01″E	JAF
Hamelin Island Nature Reserve	Ia	9	1 November 1991	34°13′21″S 115°00′55″E	WAR
Harris Nature Reserve	Ia	3,605	28 June 1974	32°49′37″S 118°48′56″E	MAL
Harrismith Nature Reserve	Ia	40	12 June 1914	32°56′42″S 117°55′31″E	AVW
Harry Waring Marsupial Reserve Nature Reserve	Ia	231	26 July 1968	32°10′00″S 115°49′58″E	SWA
Harvey Flats Nature Reserve	Ia	79	23 April 1909	32°58′02″S 115°48′54″E	SWA
Hayes Nature Reserve	Ia	1,309	31 May 1968	33°17′45″S 120°04′32″E	ESP, MAL
Heathland Nature Reserve	Ia	669	3 May 1963	33°06′36″S 118°41′15″E	MAL
Herndermuning Nature Reserve	Ia	162	14 September 1956	30°17′31″S 117°46′21″E	AVW
Highbury Nature Reserve	Ia	71	15 March 1963	33°03′26″S 117°14′39″E	AVW
Hill River Nature Reserve	Ia	883	9 November 1979	30°18′07″S 115°11′08″E	GES, SWA
Hillman Nature Reserve	Ia	248	28 March 1918	33°17′48″S 116°46′45″E	JAF
Hindmarsh Nature Reserve	Ia	160	6 December 1912	31°18′37″S 117°08′05″E	AVW
Hines Hill Nature Reserve	Ia	203	24 July 1953	31°30′58″S 118°05′12″E	AVW
Hobart Road Nature Reserve	Ia	6	18 March 1977	33°35′34″S 118°03′22″E	MAL
Holland Rocks Nature Reserve	Ia	50	15 March 1968	33°21′25″S 118°44′47″E	MAL
Hopkins Nature Reserve	Ia	579	3 February 1978	32°43′48″S 118°16′34″E	MAL
Horne Nature Reserve	Ia	167	18 March 1938	32°27′59″S 117°06′42″E	AVW
Hotham River Nature Reserve	Ia	148	13 June 1902	32°36′41″S 117°05′44″E	AVW
Howatharra Nature Reserve	Ia	71	5 June 1987	28°32′39″S 114°39′37″E	GES
Hurdle Creek Nature Reserve	Ia	275	26 April 1929	33°06′38″S 117°43′19″E	AVW
Ibis Lake Nature Reserve	Ia	27	17 March 1905	32°59′16″S 117°32′36″E	AVW
Indarra Spring Nature Reserve	Ia	2,916	20 September 1991	28°42′44″S 115°21′20″E	GES
Inkpen Road Nature Reserve	Ia	263	31 August 1999	31°49′33″S 116°25′51″E	JAF
Investigator Island Nature Reserve	Ia	41	11 May 1979	34°04′56″S 120°51′52″E	^{[1]}
Jackson Nature Reserve	Ia	910	18 February 1977	32°49′17″S 119°45′47″E	MAL
Jaloran Nature Reserve	Ia	63	18 March 1932	33°08′17″S 117°28′26″E	AVW
Jam Hill Nature Reserve	Ia	183	20 February 1959	30°41′07″S 115°48′41″E	SWA
Jandabup Nature Reserve	Ia	277	31 August 1900	31°44′37″S 115°50′38″E	SWA
Jarrkunpungu Nature Reserve	Ia	1,372	4 October 2016	19°57′17″S 119°53′38″E	DAL
Jebarjup Nature Reserve	Ia	1,016	12 January 1962	34°17′20″S 117°50′48″E	AVW, ESP
Jeffrey Lagoon Nature Reserve	Ia	121	20 September 1895	33°16′42″S 121°41′14″E	MAL
Jerdacuttup Lakes Nature Reserve	Ia	7,584	9 October 1987	33°55′25″S 120°21′50″E	ESP
Jibberding Nature Reserve	Ia	248	10 November 1905	29°59′50″S 116°49′26″E	AVW
Jilbadji Nature Reserve	Ia	208,866	22 October 1954	31°51′56″S 119°49′18″E	AVW, COO
Jingalup Nature Reserve	Ia	427	15 July 1921	34°00′14″S 117°00′53″E	JAF
Jingaring Nature Reserve	Ia	36	20 October 1911	32°25′41″S 117°21′19″E	AVW
Jinmarnkur Kulja Nature Reserve	Ia	1,727	23 September 2016	19°08′37″S 121°29′09″E	DAL
Jitarning Nature Reserve	Ia	43	26 September 1969	32°47′04″S 117°59′53″E	AVW
Jocks Well Nature Reserve	Ia	40	8 February 1929	30°12′08″S 116°15′41″E	GES
Johns Well Nature Reserve	Ia	385	23 November 1956	33°30′57″S 117°39′34″E	AVW
Jouerdine Nature Reserve	Ia	1,117	16 January 1981	30°37′52″S 118°24′24″E	AVW
Jura Nature Reserve	Ia	39	19 March 1965	31°48′29″S 118°11′25″E	AVW
Kadathinni Nature Reserve	Ia	27	8 November 1974	29°31′42″S 115°40′35″E	AVW
Kalgan Plains Nature Reserve	Ia	52	4 March 1960	34°33′22″S 117°55′59″E	ESP
Kambalda Nature Reserve	Ia	3,683	23 May 1975	31°09′30″S 121°34′38″E	COO
Karamarra Nature Reserve	Ia	44	7 June 1901	30°36′54″S 115°55′35″E	SWA
Karlgarin Nature Reserve	Ia	471	24 May 1907	32°29′55″S 118°32′55″E	MAL
Karloning Nature Reserve	Ia	64	20 November 1953	30°38′25″S 118°10′23″E	AVW
Karnet Nature Reserve	Ia	299	17 August 1973	32°23′45″S 116°00′41″E	JAF
Karroun Hill Nature Reserve	Ia	309,678	12 August 1983	29°55′29″S 118°15′14″E	AVW, COO, YAL
Kathleen Nature Reserve	Ia	1,191	16 August 1929	33°01′06″S 119°39′16″E	MAL
Kau Rock Nature Reserve	Ia	15,814	2 August 1974	33°31′28″S 122°22′50″E	MAL
Keaginine Nature Reserve	Ia	92	23 August 1912	31°48′48″S 116°21′41″E	JAF
Kendall Road Nature Reserve	Ia	56	1 December 1967	33°25′52″S 121°45′44″E	MAL
Kenwick Wetlands Nature Reserve	Ia	111	28 June 2007	32°01′33″S 115°58′30″E	SWA
King Rock Nature Reserve	Ia	52	16 September 1904	33°27′32″S 117°28′35″E	AVW
Kirwan Nature Reserve	Ia	70	21 April 1978	30°35′37″S 117°10′05″E	AVW
Kockatea Nature Reserve	Ia	48	9 September 1938	28°41′22″S 115°31′23″E	GES
Kodj Kodjin Nature Reserve	Ia	204	15 September 1950	31°27′07″S 117°46′47″E	AVW
Kodjinup Nature Reserve	Ia	626	5 April 1963	34°23′02″S 116°39′40″E	JAF
Kokerbin Nature Reserve	Ia	91	28 February 1908	31°53′12″S 117°42′18″E	AVW
Koks Island Nature Reserve	Ia	3	5 March 1976	24°44′59″S 113°09′40″E	YAL
Kondinin Lake Nature Reserve	Ia	1,688	1 March 1946	32°29′12″S 118°12′29″E	MAL
Kondinin Salt Marsh Nature Reserve	Ia	2,208	5 April 1963	32°35′03″S 118°23′08″E	MAL
Koodjee Nature Reserve	Ia	127	4 September 1931	30°53′15″S 116°01′07″E	JAF, SWA
Koolanooka Nature Reserve	Ia	6	10 March 1916	29°16′39″S 116°05′41″E	AVW
Koolanooka Dam Nature Reserve	Ia	458	6 August 1915	29°15′05″S 116°06′43″E	AVW
Koolberin Nature Reserve	Ia	17	17 August 1917	32°47′40″S 118°03′23″E	MAL
Kooljerrenup Nature Reserve	Ia	1,239	12 June 1953	32°44′51″S 115°43′36″E	SWA
Koornong Nature Reserve	Ia	251	7 July 1972	33°39′27″S 119°47′14″E	ESP
Korbel Nature Reserve	Ia	70	5 January 1990	31°39′20″S 118°09′23″E	AVW
Kordabup Nature Reserve	Ia	302	8 December 2004	34°57′27″S 117°09′35″E	WAR
Korrelocking Nature Reserve	Ia	259	19 June 1884	31°10′35″S 117°27′23″E	AVW
Kuender Nature Reserve	Ia	383	16 August 1968	32°55′38″S 118°32′00″E	MAL
Kujungurru Warrarn Nature Reserve	Ia	2,555	28 September 2016	19°43′12″S 120°44′57″E	DAL
Kulikup Nature Reserve	Ia	62	2 March 1923	33°49′27″S 116°40′05″E	JAF
Kulin Road Nature Reserve	Ia	489	1 March 1912	32°36′01″S 118°05′58″E	MAL
Kulunilup Nature Reserve	Ia	612	5 April 1963	34°20′05″S 116°47′22″E	JAF
Kulyaling Nature Reserve	Ia	17	7 February 1986	32°27′25″S 117°02′58″E	AVW
Kundip Nature Reserve	Ia	2,170	24 December 1971	33°43′36″S 120°13′34″E	ESP
Kurrawang Nature Reserve	Ia	636	11 August 1978	30°50′01″S 121°20′44″E	COO
Kwolyin Nature Reserve	Ia	344	27 August 1971	31°52′23″S 117°47′29″E	AVW
Kwolyinine Nature Reserve	Ia	544	23 August 1912	31°46′48″S 116°24′49″E	JAF
Kwornicup Lake Nature Reserve	Ia	229	19 October 1973	34°33′07″S 117°25′40″E	JAF
Lacepede Islands Nature Reserve	Ia	180	13 July 1900	16°51′18″S 122°06′08″E	DAL
Lake Ace Nature Reserve	Ia	2,392	18 February 1977	32°59′21″S 119°47′14″E	MAL
Lake Barnes Road Nature Reserve	Ia	298	22 January 1912	34°43′56″S 117°38′37″E	JAF
Lake Biddy Nature Reserve	Ia	51	17 December 1920	33°01′01″S 118°56′56″E	MAL
Lake Bryde Nature Reserve	Ia	1,635	15 March 1968	33°21′57″S 118°54′35″E	MAL
Lake Campion Nature Reserve	Ia	10,840	6 September 1957	31°08′02″S 118°22′57″E	AVW
Lake Cronin Nature Reserve	Ia	1,016	29 February 1980	32°23′18″S 119°45′52″E	COO
Lake Eyrie Nature Reserve	Ia	40	15 July 1898	34°46′29″S 117°38′23″E	JAF
Lake Gounter Nature Reserve	Ia	3,327	20 July 1934	32°24′43″S 118°49′31″E	MAL
Lake Hinds Nature Reserve	Ia	1,235	18 October 1918	30°46′48″S 116°33′36″E	AVW
Lake Hurlstone Nature Reserve	Ia	5,002	8 October 1965	32°34′15″S 119°23′51″E	MAL
Lake Janet Nature Reserve	Ia	32	15 March 1968	33°20′59″S 118°47′50″E	MAL
Lake Joondalup Nature Reserve	Ia	469	17 June 1937	31°44′09″S 115°47′01″E	SWA
Lake King Nature Reserve	Ia	40,096	11 April 1986	33°10′35″S 119°34′51″E	ESP, MAL
Lake Liddelow Nature Reserve	Ia	1,133	23 May 1969	32°27′17″S 119°17′03″E	MAL
Lake Logue Nature Reserve	Ia	5,037	5 April 1968	29°50′01″S 115°09′06″E	GES
Lake Magenta Nature Reserve	Ia	107,812	5 September 1958	33°29′54″S 119°01′38″E	MAL
Lake McLarty Nature Reserve	Ia	184	21 March 1986	32°42′14″S 115°42′55″E	SWA
Lake Mealup Nature Reserve	Ia	37	21 April 1899	32°40′55″S 115°42′47″E	SWA
Lake Mears Nature Reserve	Ia	255	15 October 1909	32°14′04″S 117°21′27″E	AVW
Lake Mortijinup Nature Reserve	Ia	486	6 October 1978	33°48′21″S 121°39′09″E	ESP
Lake Muir Nature Reserve	Ia	11,427	16 March 1973	34°29′37″S 116°40′37″E	JAF
Lake Ninan Nature Reserve	Ia	259	6 December 1963	30°57′10″S 116°38′32″E	AVW
Lake Pleasant View Nature Reserve	Ia	267	5 December 1913	34°49′35″S 118°10′46″E	JAF
Lake Powell Nature Reserve	Ia	192	2 December 1960	35°01′10″S 117°44′29″E	JAF
Lake Shaster Nature Reserve	Ia	10,505	30 November 1973	33°52′27″S 120°41′21″E	ESP
Lake Varley Nature Reserve	Ia	2,197	4 March 1966	32°42′22″S 119°22′27″E	MAL
Lake Wannamal Nature Reserve	Ia	361	13 October 1905	31°05′45″S 116°02′28″E	JAF, SWA
Lake Warden Nature Reserve	Ia	703	23 July 2010	33°49′49″S 121°52′24″E	ESP
Lakeland Nature Reserve	Ia	3,315	15 March 1968	33°15′44″S 118°43′32″E	MAL
Lambkin Nature Reserve	Ia	2	14 December 1973	32°22′03″S 115°58′35″E	SWA
Lancelin and Edwards Islands Nature Reserve	Ia	9	11 April 1958	31°00′25″S 115°18′58″E	SWA
Landscape Hill Nature Reserve	Ia	80	23 September 1988	32°31′39″S 117°24′33″E	AVW
Latham Nature Reserve	Ia	81	18 October 1912	29°46′44″S 116°32′15″E	AVW
Lavender Nature Reserve	Ia	282	6 September 1929	33°07′16″S 116°40′18″E	JAF
Leda Nature Reserve	Ia	437	5 September 1975	32°16′34″S 115°48′07″E	SWA
Lesueur Island Nature Reserve	Ia	58	1 December 2000	13°49′10″S 127°16′22″E	NOK
Little Rocky Island Nature Reserve	Ia	5	1 April 1977	21°26′02″S 115°24′51″E	PIL
Locke Estate	Ia	200	11 February 1992	33°39′55″S 115°14′08″E	SWA
Locker Island Nature Reserve	Ia	30	15 March 1968	21°42′57″S 114°46′03″E	CAR
Lockhart Nature Reserve	Ia	397	6 October 1967	33°15′28″S 119°01′51″E	MAL
Long Creek Nature Reserve	Ia	322	23 March 1973	33°35′12″S 119°46′07″E	ESP
Long Pool Nature Reserve	Ia	68	19 November 1885	30°34′22″S 116°10′39″E	AVW
Low Rocks Nature Reserve	Ia	4	23 January 1976	14°03′45″S 125°52′30″E	NOK
Lowendal Islands Nature Reserve	Ia	179	5 March 1976	20°39′05″S 115°34′43″E	CAR
Mailalup Nature Reserve	Ia	768	4 May 1962	34°21′28″S 118°28′51″E	ESP
Mallee Nature Reserve	Ia	259	3 March 1922	27°55′45″S 115°14′01″E	GES
Mallee Plain Nature Reserve	Ia	316	26 April 1929	33°02′41″S 117°42′57″E	AVW
Malyalling Nature Reserve	Ia	48	12 May 1905	32°42′48″S 117°36′24″E	AVW
Manaling Nature Reserve	Ia	211	4 August 1967	30°24′17″S 115°57′27″E	SWA
Mangkili Claypan Nature Reserve	Ia	3,636	22 April 1977	25°23′02″S 124°16′05″E	GID
Manmanning Nature Reserve	Ia	367	3 November 1950	30°54′08″S 117°05′29″E	AVW
Manmanning Dam Nature Reserve	Ia	378	21 November 1930	30°49′38″S 117°05′33″E	AVW
Manning Road Nature Reserve	Ia	42	12 July 1912	32°58′49″S 117°16′46″E	AVW
Maragoonda Nature Reserve	Ia	13	24 November 1905	33°40′30″S 117°18′26″E	AVW, JAF
Marbelup Nature Reserve	Ia	104	12 March 1958	34°59′24″S 117°43′45″E	JAF
Marble Rocks Nature Reserve	Ia	117	5 September 1930	32°30′57″S 119°24′23″E	MAL
Marchagee Nature Reserve	Ia	578	19 September 1952	29°57′38″S 116°04′38″E	AVW, GES
Marindo Nature Reserve	Ia	71	23 December 1932	30°25′55″S 117°45′57″E	AVW
Marrarup Nature Reserve	Ia	121	18 February 1898	32°47′16″S 115°57′16″E	JAF
Martinjinni Nature Reserve	Ia	254	25 August 1916	30°18′12″S 116°27′33″E	GES
Martinup Nature Reserve	Ia	91	27 September 1918	33°32′04″S 117°10′20″E	AVW
Maublarling Nature Reserve	Ia	52	27 June 1969	32°56′25″S 118°18′35″E	MAL
Maughan Nature Reserve	Ia	816	24 February 1956	31°36′17″S 118°21′33″E	AVW
Mavis Jefferys Nature Reserve	Ia	18	21 February 1997	31°35′29″S 116°26′39″E	JAF
Maya Nature Reserve	Ia	48	18 October 1912	29°49′28″S 116°31′49″E	AVW
McDougall Nature Reserve	Ia	336	20 July 1962	33°27′10″S 118°07′58″E	MAL
McGauran Nature Reserve	Ia	846	24 August 1993	28°25′07″S 115°09′53″E	GES
McGlinn Nature Reserve	Ia	292	26 September 1924	32°56′58″S 118°43′34″E	MAL
McIntosh Road Nature Reserve	Ia	28	21 April 1950	34°57′02″S 117°24′10″E	WAR
McLarty Nature Reserve	Ia	48	21 June 1957	32°41′38″S 115°41′59″E	SWA
McLean Road Nature Reserve	Ia	12	20 October 1978	34°57′04″S 117°20′21″E	WAR
Mealup Point Nature Reserve	Ia	30	22 October 1897	32°40′45″S 115°41′14″E	SWA
Meelon Nature Reserve	Ia	3	20 April 1956	32°41′21″S 115°56′11″E	SWA
Meenaar Nature Reserve	Ia	94	26 September 1969	31°38′28″S 116°53′54″E	AVW
Mehniup Nature Reserve	Ia	285	7 March 1930	34°57′47″S 117°01′15″E	WAR
Merewana Nature Reserve	Ia	40	18 January 1895	30°18′53″S 116°14′34″E	GES
Merilup Nature Reserve	Ia	874	18 June 2020	33°14′51″S 118°15′50″E	MAL
Merredin Nature Reserve	Ia	91	28 March 1991	31°31′39″S 118°13′57″E	AVW
Mettabinup Nature Reserve	Ia	164	1 May 1914	34°00′14″S 116°50′39″E	JAF
Mettler Lake Nature Reserve	Ia	402	19 July 1963	34°34′16″S 118°35′50″E	ESP
Michaelmas Island Nature Reserve	Ia	92	17 October 1969	35°02′38″S 118°02′23″E	JAF
Mill Brook Nature Reserve	Ia	1,484	3 October 1924	34°51′38″S 117°50′22″E	JAF
Milyu Nature Reserve	Ia	4	31 December 1975	31°58′58″S 115°51′00″E	SWA
Mingenew Nature Reserve	Ia	350	20 July 1893	29°10′58″S 115°25′05″E	AVW
Mininup Nature Reserve	Ia	154	13 April 1893	34°05′41″S 116°49′49″E	JAF
Minniging Nature Reserve	Ia	52	12 August 1891	32°52′19″S 117°03′13″E	AVW
Minnivale Nature Reserve	Ia	218	23 October 1970	31°08′35″S 117°11′05″E	AVW
Minyulo Nature Reserve	Ia	193	27 August 1965	30°38′47″S 115°34′34″E	GES
Miripin Nature Reserve	Ia	28	21 February 1958	33°32′27″S 117°11′52″E	AVW
Mistaken Island Nature Reserve	Ia	12	13 October 1874	35°03′46″S 117°56′35″E	WAR
Mockerdungulling Nature Reserve	Ia	33	28 April 1892	32°33′34″S 117°15′54″E	AVW
Modong Nature Reserve	Ia	156	30 March 1961	32°13′39″S 115°53′53″E	SWA
Moganmoganing Nature Reserve	Ia	53	14 June 1963	31°07′17″S 116°15′40″E	JAF
Mogumber Nature Reserve	Ia	231	16 March 1984	31°04′13″S 116°02′26″E	JAF, SWA
Mogumber West Nature Reserve	Ia	259	15 May 1896	31°00′54″S 116°00′10″E	JAF, SWA
Mokamie Nature Reserve	Ia	481	16 January 1953	31°57′07″S 117°56′02″E	AVW
Mokine Nature Reserve	Ia	289	11 February 1972	31°46′58″S 116°35′01″E	AVW, JAF
Mollerin Nature Reserve	Ia	6,637	8 November 1912	30°29′47″S 117°34′52″E	AVW
Mongelup Nature Reserve	Ia	39	26 August 1904	34°09′49″S 117°01′05″E	JAF
Moochamulla Nature Reserve	Ia	36	29 January 1915	30°58′49″S 115°48′18″E	SWA
Moojebing Nature Reserve	Ia	44	17 August 1973	33°36′26″S 117°30′01″E	AVW
Moomagul Nature Reserve	Ia	180	9 October 1970	32°34′53″S 116°51′25″E	AVW, JAF
Moondyne Nature Reserve	Ia	1,991	7 August 1970	31°34′31″S 116°12′18″E	JAF
Moonijin Nature Reserve	Ia	57	30 September 1904	30°54′57″S 117°09′26″E	AVW
Mooradung Nature Reserve	Ia	632	7 March 1974	32°53′50″S 116°33′57″E	JAF
Mooraning Nature Reserve	Ia	44	26 March 1909	31°50′51″S 117°26′57″E	AVW
Moore River Nature Reserve	Ia	4,722	13 September 1991	31°11′38″S 115°40′16″E	SWA
Moornaming Nature Reserve	Ia	78	2 December 1983	33°34′01″S 118°04′20″E	MAL
Moorumbine Nature Reserve	Ia	19	15 September 1899	32°30′46″S 117°11′27″E	AVW
Morangarel Nature Reserve	Ia	5	23 September 1983	33°17′59″S 115°42′26″E	SWA
Morangup Nature Reserve	Ia	932	16 November 1984	31°39′40″S 116°19′34″E	JAF
Mordetta Nature Reserve	Ia	374	3 December 1965	32°51′32″S 118°32′38″E	MAL
Mortlock Nature Reserve	Ia	41	29 April 1898	31°41′13″S 116°54′39″E	AVW
Morton Nature Reserve	Ia	114	26 May 1972	32°29′58″S 118°01′37″E	MAL
Moulien Nature Reserve	Ia	153	16 September 1966	31°50′02″S 117°32′21″E	AVW
Mount Burdett Nature Reserve	Ia	605	18 February 1966	33°27′53″S 122°07′55″E	MAL
Mount Byroomanning Nature Reserve	Ia	181	23 August 1974	31°22′02″S 116°07′16″E	JAF
Mount Caroline Nature Reserve	Ia	352	28 February 1908	31°47′31″S 117°38′05″E	AVW
Mount Hampton Nature Reserve	Ia	2,480	6 December 1974	31°44′46″S 119°03′20″E	AVW
Mount Manning Range Nature Reserve	Ia	36,566	18 February 2021	30°11′54″S 119°53′57″E	COO
Mount Manypeaks Nature Reserve	Ia	1,330	27 April 1979	34°54′17″S 118°15′57″E	ESP, JAF
Mount Mason Nature Reserve	Ia	194	18 August 1967	34°58′02″S 118°01′17″E	JAF
Mount Ney Nature Reserve	Ia	610	2 August 1974	33°23′44″S 122°27′17″E	MAL
Mount Nunn Nature Reserve	Ia	88	1 June 1917	29°15′18″S 115°52′06″E	AVW
Mount Pleasant Nature Reserve	Ia	57	29 March 1956	33°12′36″S 117°44′05″E	AVW
Mount Ridley Nature Reserve	Ia	1,417	25 February 1966	33°27′07″S 122°02′03″E	MAL
Mount Shadforth Nature Reserve	Ia	84	27 July 1923	34°58′30″S 117°17′00″E	WAR
Mount Stirling Nature Reserve	Ia	225	28 February 1908	31°50′00″S 117°37′10″E	AVW
Mournucking Nature Reserve	Ia	697	17 January 1958	31°43′25″S 117°42′23″E	AVW
Muiron Islands Nature Reserve	Ia	988	2 February 1973	21°41′07″S 114°19′24″E	CAR
Mullet Lake Nature Reserve	Ia	1,885	2 October 1953	33°48′57″S 122°00′00″E	ESP
Mungaroona Range Nature Reserve	Ia	105,842	30 June 1972	21°51′07″S 118°19′44″E	PIL
Mungarri Nature Reserve	Ia	438	10 February 1922	30°20′38″S 117°45′15″E	AVW
Mungerungcutting Nature Reserve	Ia	21	2 March 1893	32°45′36″S 117°25′14″E	AVW
Munglinup Nature Reserve	Ia	150	17 August 1962	33°44′12″S 120°53′44″E	ESP
Muntz Nature Reserve	Ia	3,618	29 June 1973	33°34′18″S 122°50′30″E	ESP, MAL
Murapin Nature Reserve	Ia	74	4 July 1919	33°32′17″S 117°11′12″E	AVW
Murnanying Nature Reserve	Ia	22	26 March 1970	32°25′33″S 117°14′51″E	AVW
Nabaroo Nature Reserve	Ia	8	8 August 1969	31°04′53″S 115°31′46″E	SWA
Nallian Nature Reserve	Ia	97	17 September 1897	33°13′59″S 117°25′52″E	AVW
Namban Nature Reserve	Ia	292	5 October 1951	30°21′48″S 115°58′52″E	GES, SWA
Namelcatchem Nature Reserve	Ia	259	19 June 1884	31°10′54″S 117°11′30″E	AVW
Namming Nature Reserve	Ia	5,432	12 May 1967	30°56′22″S 115°34′37″E	SWA
Nanamoolan Nature Reserve	Ia	14	18 April 1975	31°38′54″S 116°29′17″E	JAF
Nangeen Hill Nature Reserve	Ia	178	26 January 1951	31°50′17″S 117°41′05″E	AVW
Nangeenan Nature Reserve	Ia	61	31 August 1956	31°30′43″S 118°09′49″E	AVW
Napier Nature Reserve	Ia	219	14 November 1924	34°45′17″S 117°58′26″E	JAF
Napping Nature Reserve	Ia	61	28 September 1934	32°37′50″S 116°57′48″E	AVW
Narlingup Nature Reserve	Ia	145	27 March 1903	33°51′27″S 116°53′30″E	JAF
Neale Junction Nature Reserve	Ia	723,073	1 July 1977	28°19′57″S 126°00′05″E	GVD
Neaves Road Nature Reserve	Ia	9	11 September 2003	31°39′07″S 115°57′07″E	SWA
Needham Nature Reserve	Ia	7	20 March 1908	31°48′28″S 116°18′43″E	JAF
Needilup Nature Reserve	Ia	622	14 August 1914	33°49′45″S 118°48′32″E	MAL
Neendojer Rock Nature Reserve	Ia	2,249	27 July 1977	31°52′23″S 119°08′30″E	AVW
Neerabup Nature Reserve	Ia	132	2 November 1956	31°38′01″S 115°43′45″E	SWA
Nembudding Nature Reserve	Ia	38	19 November 1976	31°11′29″S 117°33′47″E	AVW
Nembudding South Nature Reserve	Ia	11	2 July 1915	31°13′54″S 117°34′57″E	AVW
Neredup Nature Reserve	Ia	1,709	2 August 1974	33°33′19″S 122°54′15″E	MAL
Ngopitchup Nature Reserve	Ia	40	6 April 1900	33°56′30″S 117°21′15″E	JAF
Niblick Nature Reserve	Ia	839	2 December 1983	33°27′24″S 122°59′11″E	MAL
Nilgen Nature Reserve	Ia	5,516	23 February 1973	30°56′57″S 115°19′51″E	SWA
Nilligarri Nature Reserve	Ia	7	23 April 1909	28°30′01″S 114°37′02″E	GES
Nine Mile Lake Nature Reserve	Ia	113	19 July 1918	32°44′21″S 115°46′41″E	SWA
Nollajup Nature Reserve	Ia	663	8 December 2004	33°52′57″S 116°20′12″E	JAF
Nonalling Nature Reserve	Ia	506	20 April 1956	32°32′26″S 117°37′35″E	AVW
Noobijup Nature Reserve	Ia	183	5 April 1963	34°24′15″S 116°47′17″E	JAF
Noombling Nature Reserve	Ia	71	22 December 1961	32°31′36″S 117°00′05″E	AVW
Noonebin Nature Reserve	Ia	4	10 April 1908	32°34′27″S 117°14′28″E	AVW
Noonying Nature Reserve	Ia	49	19 October 1906	31°39′26″S 117°27′02″E	AVW
Noorajin Soak Nature Reserve	Ia	202	8 June 1906	30°45′38″S 117°14′49″E	AVW
Norpa Nature Reserve	Ia	203	8 August 1930	31°34′51″S 118°24′49″E	AVW
North Baandee Nature Reserve	Ia	147	24 December 1926	31°22′02″S 117°56′36″E	AVW
North Beacon Nature Reserve	Ia	105	11 May 1945	30°24′36″S 117°53′12″E	AVW
North Bonnie Rock Nature Reserve	Ia	194	6 September 1968	30°29′11″S 118°20′09″E	AVW
North Bungulla Nature Reserve	Ia	93	27 January 1922	31°31′34″S 117°35′29″E	AVW
North Dandalup Nature Reserve	Ia	182	10 May 1991	32°28′28″S 116°00′13″E	JAF
North Jitarning Nature Reserve	Ia	45	18 February 1966	32°45′56″S 118°01′34″E	MAL
North Karlgarin Nature Reserve	Ia	5,822	7 February 1930	32°19′27″S 118°31′15″E	MAL
North Sandy Island Nature Reserve	Ia	20	1 December 2000	21°06′13″S 115°39′13″E	PIL
North Sister Nature Reserve	Ia	1,008	27 July 1962	34°47′36″S 118°10′41″E	JAF
North Tammin Nature Reserve	Ia	30	9 March 1900	31°32′29″S 117°28′26″E	AVW
North Tarin Rock Nature Reserve	Ia	2,142	8 August 1969	32°59′21″S 118°15′04″E	MAL
North Turtle Island Nature Reserve	Ia	51	1 April 1977	19°53′20″S 118°53′52″E	PIL
North Wagin Nature Reserve	Ia	62	24 July 1970	33°17′22″S 117°19′35″E	AVW
North Wallambin Nature Reserve	Ia	303	15 March 1963	30°54′45″S 117°37′47″E	AVW
North Woyerling Nature Reserve	Ia	24	26 April 1929	32°28′27″S 117°23′40″E	AVW
North Yilliminning Nature Reserve	Ia	114	15 June 1934	32°50′49″S 117°22′08″E	AVW
Nugadong Nature Reserve	Ia	10	27 September 1968	30°12′17″S 116°39′47″E	AVW
Nukarni Nature Reserve	Ia	95	28 April 1967	31°17′38″S 118°12′22″E	AVW
Nullilla Nature Reserve	Ia	5	10 January 2001	31°24′16″S 115°54′46″E	SWA
Nuytsland Nature Reserve	Ia	599,158	25 June 1965	32°50′21″S 124°44′38″E	COO, ESP, HAM, MAL
Oakabella Nature Reserve	Ia	33	27 October 1939	28°28′40″S 114°37′54″E	GES
Oakajee Nature Reserve	Ia	124	29 July 1879	28°34′25″S 114°39′07″E	GES
Ockley Nature Reserve	Ia	145	14 September 1934	32°50′52″S 117°23′30″E	AVW
Ogilvie Nature Reserve	Ia	76	1 April 1910	28°10′47″S 114°38′36″E	GES
Old Store Nature Reserve	Ia	62	4 November 1927	30°23′42″S 117°09′37″E	AVW
One Mile Rocks Nature Reserve	Ia	865	11 July 1969	33°12′28″S 119°48′46″E	MAL
One Tree Point Nature Reserve	Ia	483	19 August 1966	24°51′25″S 113°38′17″E	CAR
Ongerup Lagoon Nature Reserve	Ia	51	24 September 1891	34°39′58″S 117°34′04″E	JAF
Orchid Nature Reserve	Ia	56	16 March 1893	34°21′35″S 117°32′10″E	JAF
Ord River Nature Reserve	Ia	79,842	4 May 1973	15°16′31″S 128°17′30″E	NOK, VIB
Overheu Nature Reserve	Ia	19	12 February 1960	32°22′23″S 117°34′58″E	AVW
Overshot Hill Nature Reserve	Ia	431	21 May 1965	33°31′50″S 120°00′41″E	ESP
Owingup Nature Reserve	Ia	2,459	16 June 1989	34°59′38″S 117°03′54″E	WAR
Pagett Nature Reserve	Ia	1,400	8 December 2004	34°12′19″S 115°22′10″E	JAF, WAR
Pallarup Nature Reserve	Ia	4,185	4 July 1969	33°13′49″S 119°45′03″E	ESP, MAL
Pallinup Nature Reserve	Ia	425	4 August 1967	34°24′40″S 118°42′31″E	ESP
Pantapin Nature Reserve	Ia	0.46	27 July 1923	31°57′08″S 117°39′16″E	AVW
Paperbark Nature Reserve	Ia	120	8 July 1910	32°24′38″S 118°05′22″E	MAL
Pardelup Nature Reserve	Ia	607	1 December 1950	34°39′52″S 117°25′18″E	JAF
Pardelup Road Nature Reserve	Ia	42	24 September 1948	34°39′33″S 117°23′40″E	JAF
Parkerville Nature Reserve	Ia	4	3 May 1912	31°51′55″S 116°07′16″E	JAF
Parkeyerring Nature Reserve	Ia	991	16 August 1957	33°22′40″S 117°20′03″E	AVW
Parry Lagoons Nature Reserve	Ia	35,914	21 August 1992	15°40′48″S 128°18′05″E	VIB
Pederah Nature Reserve	Ia	403	27 February 1970	32°38′26″S 118°40′00″E	MAL
Pelican Island Nature Reserve	Ia	8	20 December 1968	14°46′11″S 128°46′27″E	VIB
Peringillup Nature Reserve	Ia	218	12 October 1979	33°56′27″S 117°39′01″E	AVW
Petercarring Nature Reserve	Ia	100	26 April 1929	32°30′31″S 117°15′05″E	AVW
Phillips Brook Nature Reserve	Ia	49	2 October 1883	34°53′02″S 117°46′06″E	JAF
Piara Nature Reserve	Ia	40	24 April 1980	32°08′22″S 115°55′20″E	SWA
Pikaring Nature Reserve	Ia	106	1 June 1893	32°05′05″S 117°43′18″E	AVW
Pikaring West Nature Reserve	Ia	61	15 September 1950	32°05′11″S 117°41′58″E	AVW
Pindicup Nature Reserve	Ia	281	5 April 1963	34°24′43″S 116°43′19″E	JAF
Pingaring Nature Reserve	Ia	68	13 August 1954	32°44′48″S 118°38′58″E	MAL
Pingeculling Nature Reserve	Ia	243	29 February 1980	32°24′09″S 117°06′43″E	AVW
Pingelly Nature Reserve	Ia	5	7 June 1968	32°32′31″S 117°04′31″E	AVW
Pinjarrega Nature Reserve	Ia	18,221	19 December 1958	30°03′30″S 115°54′19″E	GES
Pintharuka Nature Reserve	Ia	62	26 October 1979	29°06′05″S 115°59′28″E	AVW
Pintharuka Well Nature Reserve	Ia	67	26 May 1911	29°05′30″S 115°57′46″E	AVW
Pinticup Nature Reserve	Ia	75	5 April 1963	34°27′54″S 116°48′32″E	JAF
Plain Hills Nature Reserve	Ia	217	28 March 1980	32°52′44″S 118°05′55″E	MAL
Plumridge Lakes Nature Reserve	Ia	308,990	22 April 1977	29°31′26″S 125°02′35″E	GVD, NUL
Point Spring Nature Reserve	Ia	303	1 April 1977	15°24′12″S 128°53′18″E	VIB
Poison Gully Nature Reserve	Ia	87	21 September 1928	31°27′53″S 116°23′46″E	JAF
Pootenup Nature Reserve	Ia	47	27 May 1983	34°14′06″S 117°38′39″E	AVW
Port Kennedy Scientific Park Nature Reserve	Ia	693	12 March 1996	32°23′01″S 115°44′35″E	SWA
Powlalup Nature Reserve	Ia	67	9 October 1959	33°51′35″S 115°54′50″E	JAF
Protheroe Nature Reserve	Ia	68	18 December 1964	28°30′31″S 114°44′34″E	GES
Quagering Nature Reserve	Ia	33	20 June 1958	34°51′58″S 116°02′20″E	WAR
Quairading Spring Nature Reserve	Ia	29	8 May 1908	32°02′49″S 117°24′27″E	AVW
Quarram Nature Reserve	Ia	3,825	6 February 1976	35°00′31″S 117°00′12″E	WAR
Queen Victoria Spring Nature Reserve	Ia	272,598	21 August 1970	30°23′36″S 123°31′09″E	COO, GVD, MUR
Quindinup Nature Reserve	Ia	2,653	15 January 1960	34°24′55″S 116°51′12″E	JAF
Quins Hill Nature Reserve	Ia	9	24 February 1995	30°59′09″S 115°47′01″E	SWA
Quongunnerunding Nature Reserve	Ia	274	24 February 1989	33°00′19″S 117°27′42″E	AVW
Randell Road Nature Reserve	Ia	445	11 January 1963	34°27′57″S 117°12′04″E	JAF
Recherche Archipelago Nature Reserve	Ia	7,145	21 May 1948	34°06′06″S 123°11′16″E	ESP
Red Hill Nature Reserve	Ia	253	26 June 1970	33°47′02″S 116°44′31″E	JAF
Red Lake Nature Reserve	Ia	54	3 September 1920	32°11′57″S 118°05′28″E	AVW
Red Lake Townsite Nature Reserve	Ia	76	14 March 1969	33°08′46″S 121°42′06″E	MAL
Redmond Road Nature Reserve	Ia	52	25 August 1972	34°56′55″S 117°20′03″E	WAR
Reen Road Nature Reserve	Ia	97	8 November 2019	31°43′36″S 116°09′32″E	JAF
Rica Erickson Nature Reserve	Ia	124	4 June 1965	31°08′52″S 116°18′07″E	JAF
Ridley North Nature Reserve	Ia	393	30 September 1966	33°13′18″S 121°51′15″E	MAL
Ridley South Nature Reserve	Ia	1,106	8 October 1965	33°15′58″S 121°48′25″E	MAL
Riverdale Nature Reserve	Ia	38	8 April 1910	32°59′25″S 115°47′07″E	SWA
Roach Nature Reserve	Ia	258	22 August 1969	31°58′30″S 118°20′05″E	AVW
Rock Hole Dam Nature Reserve	Ia	257	29 September 1892	34°17′14″S 117°17′33″E	JAF
Rock View Nature Reserve	Ia	1,733	31 January 1969	32°54′41″S 119°01′43″E	MAL
Roe Nature Reserve	Ia	1,246	7 February 1930	32°19′30″S 118°42′13″E	MAL
Rogers Nature Reserve	Ia	341	9 August 1985	30°50′56″S 116°39′42″E	AVW
Rose Road Nature Reserve	Ia	50	6 August 1976	32°48′19″S 118°19′23″E	MAL
Rosedale Nature Reserve	Ia	134	29 January 1932	32°49′47″S 117°09′32″E	AVW
Round Island Nature Reserve	Ia	7	15 June 1993	21°38′45″S 114°39′15″E	CAR
Ruabon Townsite Nature Reserve	Ia	33	2 May 1975	33°38′41″S 115°30′32″E	SWA
Rudyard Beach Nature Reserve	Ia	38	18 August 1950	34°58′53″S 117°25′25″E	WAR
Rugged Hills Nature Reserve	Ia	254	27 September 1935	31°30′42″S 116°23′34″E	JAF
Sabina Nature Reserve	Ia	102	11 February 1972	33°38′47″S 115°23′58″E	SWA
Salt Lake Nature Reserve	Ia	151	16 December 1960	34°18′11″S 117°48′05″E	AVW
Sand Spring Well Nature Reserve	Ia	19	16 April 1915	31°10′23″S 115°44′33″E	SWA
Sandford Rocks Nature Reserve	Ia	807	9 May 1889	31°13′51″S 118°44′58″E	AVW
Sawyers Nature Reserve	Ia	16	7 September 1923	30°20′17″S 117°02′31″E	AVW
Scotsdale Road Nature Reserve	Ia	23	2 November 1951	34°56′16″S 117°21′07″E	WAR
Scriveners Nature Reserve	Ia	903	25 February 1921	32°24′44″S 118°42′58″E	MAL
Seagroatt Nature Reserve	Ia	1,149	8 August 1958	32°07′39″S 118°09′39″E	AVW
Seal Island (WA25645) Nature Reserve	Ia	4	27 May 1960	34°22′48″S 115°09′25″E	WAR
Seal Island (WA32199) Nature Reserve	Ia	3	10 August 1973	35°04′32″S 117°58′29″E	WAR
Serrurier Island Nature Reserve	Ia	351	23 January 1976	21°36′26″S 114°40′50″E	CAR
Sevenmile Well Nature Reserve	Ia	52	25 January 1901	31°03′45″S 116°12′08″E	JAF
Sewell Nature Reserve	Ia	73	30 September 1904	32°33′05″S 117°46′48″E	AVW
Shackleton Nature Reserve	Ia	447	3 August 1956	31°54′11″S 117°49′49″E	AVW
Shark Lake Nature Reserve	Ia	11	21 January 1972	33°46′02″S 121°51′37″E	ESP
Shelter Island Nature Reserve	Ia	10	30 March 1973	35°03′03″S 117°41′34″E	WAR
Silver Wattle Hill Nature Reserve	Ia	1,660	15 March 1968	33°10′25″S 118°49′20″E	MAL
Six Mile Road Nature Reserve	Ia	16	2 November 1962	33°52′14″S 116°28′23″E	JAF
Ski Lake Nature Reserve	Ia	93	26 June 1992	32°02′52″S 118°31′32″E	AVW
Sleeman Creek Nature Reserve	Ia	416	3 October 1924	34°50′10″S 117°38′36″E	JAF
Sloss Nature Reserve	Ia	366	4 August 1911	31°58′57″S 118°58′58″E	AVW
Smith Brook Nature Reserve	Ia	96	12 April 1912	34°21′05″S 116°10′22″E	JAF, WAR
Snake Gully Nature Reserve	Ia	300	24 August 1906	30°12′48″S 116°57′53″E	AVW
Sorensens Nature Reserve	Ia	108	1 September 1915	32°07′45″S 117°55′10″E	AVW
South Buniche Nature Reserve	Ia	1,298	3 May 1963	33°05′40″S 118°47′24″E	MAL
South Eneabba Nature Reserve	Ia	7,914	18 February 1966	29°53′33″S 115°15′33″E	GES
South Jingalup Nature Reserve	Ia	551	15 July 1921	34°01′53″S 116°59′51″E	JAF
South Kuender Nature Reserve	Ia	356	3 December 1965	32°59′24″S 118°32′46″E	MAL
South Kulin Nature Reserve	Ia	13	26 August 1977	32°45′29″S 118°03′39″E	MAL
South Kumminin Nature Reserve	Ia	95	30 December 1983	32°11′48″S 118°20′16″E	AVW, MAL
South Mimegarra Nature Reserve	Ia	346	16 October 1970	30°58′54″S 115°30′32″E	SWA
South Sister Nature Reserve	Ia	338	21 February 1964	34°48′39″S 118°09′02″E	JAF
South Stirling Nature Reserve	Ia	1,715	15 March 1963	34°35′57″S 118°13′12″E	ESP
South Wilgoyne Nature Reserve	Ia	118	11 December 1970	30°48′32″S 118°28′28″E	AVW
Southern Beekeepers Nature Reserve	Ia	10,863	11 May 1979	30°23′25″S 115°07′05″E	SWA
Sparks Road Nature Reserve	Ia	20	27 January 1911	32°41′31″S 117°55′37″E	AVW
Speddingup East Nature Reserve	Ia	69	24 May 1968	33°30′44″S 121°45′57″E	ESP
Springdale Nature Reserve	Ia	25	8 July 1966	33°48′41″S 120°57′02″E	ESP
St Alouarn Island Nature Reserve	Ia	8	27 May 1960	34°24′15″S 115°11′44″E	WAR
St. Ronans Nature Reserve	Ia	118	23 October 1970	31°52′46″S 116°35′35″E	JAF
Stinton Cascades Nature Reserve	Ia	133	28 October 1927	32°06′10″S 116°06′36″E	JAF
Stockdill Road Nature Reserve	Ia	56	16 May 1986	34°15′12″S 115°03′53″E	WAR
Strange Road Nature Reserve	Ia	553	11 May 1979	32°25′19″S 116°37′17″E	JAF
Strathmore Hill Nature Reserve	Ia	171	5 May 1989	33°36′28″S 117°21′36″E	AVW
Stretton Road Nature Reserve	Ia	60	21 June 1907	32°32′15″S 118°09′10″E	MAL
Sugar Loaf Rock Nature Reserve	Ia	1	29 September 1972	33°33′33″S 115°00′19″E	JAF
Swan Island Nature Reserve	Ia	29	17 September 1976	16°21′05″S 123°02′44″E	DAL
Swan Lagoon Nature Reserve	Ia	347	18 December 1903	33°16′23″S 121°38′57″E	MAL
Sweetman Nature Reserve	Ia	63	8 November 1974	29°30′10″S 115°39′35″E	AVW
Taarblin Lake Nature Reserve	Ia	1,013	24 February 1905	32°57′37″S 117°33′11″E	AVW
Takenup Road Nature Reserve	Ia	10	14 December 1962	34°44′28″S 117°59′57″E	JAF
Talbot Road Nature Reserve	Ia	87	16 September 2019	31°51′55″S 116°02′57″E	SWA
Tammin Railway Dam Nature Reserve	Ia	256	1 August 1952	31°40′01″S 117°32′53″E	AVW
Tank Hill Nature Reserve	Ia	702	24 July 1970	31°27′48″S 118°24′21″E	AVW
Tanner Island Nature Reserve	Ia	1	1 December 2000	16°05′38″S 123°31′46″E	NOK
Tapper Road Nature Reserve	Ia	117	14 November 1975	32°36′36″S 119°32′04″E	MAL
Tarin Rock Nature Reserve	Ia	2,011	29 July 1960	33°05′56″S 118°10′07″E	MAL
Tennessee North Nature Reserve	Ia	16	24 September 1915	35°02′18″S 117°33′34″E	WAR
Tent Island Nature Reserve	Ia	2,015	15 June 1993	22°01′21″S 114°31′23″E	CAR
Tenterden Nature Reserve	Ia	81	12 February 1971	34°21′39″S 117°33′50″E	JAF
The Forty Four Mile Nature Reserve	Ia	549	21 March 1930	28°40′01″S 115°13′16″E	GES
The Tubbs Nature Reserve	Ia	13	6 August 1976	28°11′11″S 114°51′26″E	GES
Thomsons Lake Nature Reserve	Ia	551	8 August 1955	32°09′02″S 115°49′47″E	SWA
Three Swamps Nature Reserve	Ia	357	12 January 1962	34°13′07″S 117°56′40″E	MAL
Throssell Nature Reserve	Ia	18	20 September 1912	31°37′14″S 116°51′27″E	AVW
Timaru Nature Reserve	Ia	75	27 November 2001	31°27′34″S 115°54′51″E	SWA
Tinkelelup Nature Reserve	Ia	576	2 March 1962	34°40′27″S 118°27′02″E	ESP
Tone-Perup Nature Reserve	Ia	55,935	8 December 2004	34°13′38″S 116°35′42″E	JAF
Toolibin Nature Reserve	Ia	497	12 October 1956	32°55′01″S 117°36′33″E	AVW
Toolonga Nature Reserve	Ia	404,558	9 September 1988	26°59′58″S 114°57′51″E	CAR, MUR, YAL
Toompup Nature Reserve	Ia	209	28 October 1966	34°00′33″S 118°25′49″E	MAL
Tootanellup Nature Reserve	Ia	944	24 November 1944	34°29′38″S 117°07′15″E	JAF
Towerrining Nature Reserve	Ia	162	21 March 1958	33°34′52″S 116°47′10″E	JAF
Trigwell Nature Reserve	Ia	244	19 February 1954	33°37′40″S 116°34′17″E	JAF
Truslove North Nature Reserve	Ia	194	5 October 1917	33°20′24″S 121°42′42″E	MAL
Truslove Townsite Nature Reserve	Ia	6,066	4 February 1966	33°23′10″S 121°49′08″E	MAL
Tutanning Nature Reserve	Ia	2,420	12 February 1960	32°33′38″S 117°20′51″E	AVW
Twin Swamps Nature Reserve	IV	155	30 September 1966	31°43′17″S 116°00′57″E	SWA
Two Peoples Bay Nature Reserve	IV	4,745	22 April 1966	34°59′14″S 118°09′53″E	JAF
Twongkup Nature Reserve	Ia	81	20 October 1892	34°19′29″S 117°26′39″E	AVW, JAF
Twyata Nature Reserve	Ia	152	11 September 1964	30°21′40″S 115°29′01″E	GES
Udumung Nature Reserve	Ia	202	31 March 1905	31°10′54″S 116°10′27″E	JAF
Ulva Nature Reserve	Ia	59	25 May 1958	31°35′37″S 118°11′10″E	AVW
Unicup Nature Reserve	Ia	3,296	2 December 1960	34°21′16″S 116°43′24″E	JAF
Urawa Nature Reserve	Ia	8,765	11 July 1975	28°13′57″S 115°36′11″E	AVW, YAL
Utcha Well Nature Reserve	Ia	312	25 December 1883	28°04′27″S 114°11′36″E	GES
Vagg Nature Reserve	Ia	108	26 April 1929	33°07′50″S 117°36′48″E	AVW
Victor Island Nature Reserve	Ia	19	15 June 1993	21°55′20″S 114°25′55″E	CAR
Victoria Rock Nature Reserve	Ia	259	2 January 1903	31°17′48″S 120°55′35″E	COO
Wagin Lake Nature Reserve	Ia	116	24 August 1911	33°19′46″S 117°20′53″E	AVW
Wahkinup Nature Reserve	Ia	81	28 April 1905	33°54′09″S 116°45′29″E	JAF
Walburra Nature Reserve	Ia	22	27 September 1929	33°47′30″S 115°07′08″E	JAF
Walbyring Nature Reserve	Ia	144	1 November 1912	32°56′01″S 117°35′25″E	AVW
Walcancobbing Nature Reserve	Ia	592	14 July 1978	31°14′31″S 117°54′01″E	AVW
Walk Walkin Nature Reserve	Ia	241	22 November 1957	30°48′33″S 117°19′10″E	AVW
Wallaby Hills Nature Reserve	Ia	59	21 March 1986	31°50′58″S 116°59′08″E	AVW
Wallambin Nature Reserve	Ia	122	2 July 1937	31°01′12″S 117°29′54″E	AVW
Walyahmoning Nature Reserve	Ia	20,925	16 March 1979	30°36′57″S 118°45′17″E	COO
Walyormouring Nature Reserve	Ia	294	14 March 1919	31°08′53″S 116°52′24″E	AVW
Wamballup Nature Reserve	Ia	474	6 August 1909	34°30′54″S 117°27′05″E	JAF
Wambyn Nature Reserve	Ia	215	6 April 1939	31°54′02″S 116°38′15″E	AVW, JAF
Wamenusking Nature Reserve	Ia	47	24 March 1916	32°07′33″S 117°30′49″E	AVW
Wanagarren Nature Reserve	Ia	11,081	8 December 1972	30°46′00″S 115°13′18″E	SWA
Wandana Nature Reserve	Ia	53,453	7 December 1979	28°09′48″S 115°13′17″E	GES, YAL
Wandi Nature Reserve	Ia	31	6 July 1979	32°12′09″S 115°52′15″E	SWA
Wandjagill Nature Reserve	Ia	764	17 March 1961	32°04′25″S 118°09′04″E	AVW
Wandoora Nature Reserve	Ia	22	10 November 1916	34°11′24″S 116°54′51″E	JAF
Wangeling Gully Nature Reserve	Ia	85	27 October 1905	33°13′14″S 117°05′39″E	AVW
Wanjarri Nature Reserve	Ia	52,490	18 June 1971	27°22′28″S 120°43′18″E	MUR
Wansbrough Nature Reserve	Ia	126	14 July 1978	34°08′53″S 117°39′58″E	AVW
Wardering Lake Nature Reserve	Ia	43	4 July 1919	33°31′49″S 117°14′54″E	AVW
Warramuggan Nature Reserve	Ia	249	2 July 1915	30°58′03″S 117°27′04″E	AVW
Warranine Nature Reserve	Ia	35	8 November 1985	31°44′39″S 116°32′16″E	JAF
Warrawah Nature Reserve	Ia	77	4 June 1954	28°45′12″S 115°34′43″E	AVW, GES
Warrenup Nature Reserve	Ia	251	17 December 1891	34°20′32″S 117°15′24″E	JAF
Watkins Road Nature Reserve	Ia	54	25 November 1949	32°18′02″S 116°00′08″E	SWA
Wattening Nature Reserve	Ia	50	28 September 1893	31°19′01″S 116°33′51″E	AVW
Weam Nature Reserve	Ia	226	13 September 1968	32°22′33″S 117°06′26″E	AVW
Wedge Island Nature Reserve	Ia	4	9 August 1968	30°49′41″S 115°11′18″E	SWA
Wedgengully Nature Reserve	Ia	22	28 November 1876	32°27′52″S 117°56′54″E	AVW
Weelhamby Lake Nature Reserve	Ia	460	16 May 1969	29°17′23″S 116°25′02″E	AVW
Weira Nature Reserve	Ia	86	30 July 1993	30°58′34″S 118°22′40″E	AVW
Weirmonger Nature Reserve	Ia	8	26 August 1927	28°24′04″S 115°05′32″E	GES
Weld Island Nature Reserve	Ia	23	15 June 1993	21°23′07″S 115°32′39″E	PIL
Wellard Nature Reserve	Ia	10	6 July 1894	33°03′07″S 115°48′59″E	SWA
Welsh Nature Reserve	Ia	1,717	17 April 1970	31°57′49″S 119°07′16″E	AVW
West Mount Mason Nature Reserve	Ia	9	18 August 1967	34°57′58″S 118°00′17″E	JAF
West Perenjori Nature Reserve	Ia	347	31 May 1963	29°28′10″S 116°12′11″E	AVW
Westmere Nature Reserve	Ia	16	30 November 1981	32°54′44″S 116°46′57″E	JAF
Whalebone Island Nature Reserve	Ia	2	15 June 1993	22°11′41″S 114°22′46″E	^{[2]}
Whin Bin Rock Nature Reserve	Ia	34	4 June 1965	33°04′53″S 117°26′21″E	AVW
Whistler Nature Reserve	Ia	18	14 March 1975	34°23′31″S 116°05′42″E	WAR
White Gums Nature Reserve	Ia	160	17 May 1963	29°45′48″S 115°23′56″E	GES
White Lake Nature Reserve	Ia	174	14 March 1980	34°46′09″S 118°09′43″E	JAF
Whitmore, Roberts, Doole Islands and Sandalwood Landing Nature Reserve	Ia	546	15 June 1993	22°28′17″S 114°09′37″E	CAR
Wialkutting Nature Reserve	Ia	65	21 June 1912	32°05′29″S 117°49′02″E	AVW
Wild Horse Swamp Nature Reserve	Ia	294	23 September 1890	33°40′45″S 116°43′22″E	JAF
Wilga Nature Reserve	Ia	32	3 May 1968	33°41′55″S 116°14′12″E	JAF
Wilgarrup Nature Reserve	Ia	85	8 October 1909	34°07′28″S 116°10′10″E	JAF
Williams Nature Reserve	Ia	206	20 March 1936	33°01′25″S 116°51′14″E	JAF
Willoughby Nature Reserve	Ia	693	9 October 1964	33°35′39″S 118°27′45″E	MAL
Wills Nature Reserve	Ia	36	26 August 1983	32°22′10″S 116°44′21″E	JAF
Wilroy Nature Reserve	Ia	331	9 February 1962	28°38′11″S 115°38′26″E	AVW
Wilson Nature Reserve	Ia	1,099	12 August 1983	29°32′17″S 115°26′28″E	GES
Wingedine Nature Reserve	Ia	254	10 March 1967	33°35′41″S 117°14′05″E	AVW
Wockallarry Nature Reserve	Ia	208	24 December 1968	31°27′29″S 119°16′32″E	AVW, COO
Wogerlin Nature Reserve	Ia	94	14 May 1976	32°10′18″S 117°50′35″E	AVW
Wokatherra Nature Reserve	Ia	112	8 November 1985	28°39′03″S 114°39′24″E	GES
Wongamine Nature Reserve	Ia	299	31 October 1975	31°29′30″S 116°35′11″E	AVW
Wongan Hills Nature Reserve	Ia	417	15 August 1975	30°48′24″S 116°38′12″E	AVW
Wongonderrah Nature Reserve	Ia	439	9 March 1962	30°33′56″S 115°21′25″E	SWA
Wongoondy Nature Reserve	Ia	306	1 December 1933	28°54′34″S 115°25′55″E	AVW, GES
Woodanilling Nature Reserve	Ia	134	8 September 1911	33°34′00″S 117°28′32″E	AVW
Woody Island Nature Reserve	Ia	195	2 May 1986	33°57′45″S 122°00′58″E	ESP
Woody Lake Nature Reserve	Ia	945	6 March 1914	33°48′45″S 121°54′33″E	ESP
Woondowing Nature Reserve	Ia	1,532	23 August 1912	31°44′29″S 116°24′59″E	JAF
Woorgabup Nature Reserve	Ia	49	12 November 1954	33°33′49″S 117°54′53″E	AVW
Woottating Nature Reserve	Ia	234	22 May 1970	31°52′17″S 116°26′45″E	JAF
Wotto Nature Reserve	Ia	3,671	23 May 1969	29°43′29″S 115°26′56″E	GES
Woyerling Nature Reserve	Ia	15	26 May 1905	32°31′15″S 117°24′15″E	AVW
Wulyaling Nature Reserve	Ia	40	1 June 1893	32°05′18″S 117°58′13″E	AVW
Wundowlin Nature Reserve	Ia	729	4 July 1941	30°52′03″S 118°04′41″E	AVW
Wyalkatchem Nature Reserve	Ia	256	8 January 1954	31°09′47″S 117°24′29″E	AVW
Wyening Nature Reserve	Ia	81	9 February 1951	31°10′23″S 116°32′17″E	AVW
Wyola Nature Reserve	Ia	36	25 October 1957	31°38′20″S 117°21′58″E	AVW
Wyvern Road Nature Reserve	Ia	7	29 December 1967	33°22′54″S 116°07′39″E	JAF
Xantippe Nature Reserve	Ia	189	27 June 1930	30°16′06″S 117°01′49″E	AVW
Y Island Nature Reserve	Ia	35	15 June 1993	21°57′11″S 114°25′13″E	CAR
Yackrikine Nature Reserve	Ia	105	17 May 1963	33°03′43″S 117°31′04″E	AVW
Yallatup Nature Reserve	Ia	40	12 August 1983	33°25′45″S 116°23′19″E	JAF
Yandinilling Nature Reserve	Ia	65	23 June 1916	32°04′21″S 117°04′51″E	AVW
Yanneymooning Nature Reserve	Ia	532	1 June 1956	30°42′32″S 118°33′33″E	AVW, COO
Yardanogo Nature Reserve	Ia	6,591	17 August 1979	29°22′20″S 115°04′42″E	GES
Yarding Nature Reserve	Ia	232	10 January 1964	31°55′31″S 117°59′05″E	AVW
Yarling Nature Reserve	Ia	103	2 May 1952	32°49′15″S 117°27′13″E	AVW
Yarloop Nature Reserve	Ia	9	7 January 2004	32°57′19″S 115°54′43″E	SWA
Yarnup Nature Reserve	Ia	62	17 January 1969	34°22′30″S 116°51′59″E	JAF
Yarra Yarra Lakes Nature Reserve	Ia	1,400	7 September 1962	29°35′19″S 115°46′26″E	AVW
Yeal Nature Reserve	Ia	11,299	18 December 1992	31°27′53″S 115°49′25″E	SWA
Yelbeni Nature Reserve	Ia	82	8 May 1914	31°09′53″S 117°39′46″E	AVW
Yellowdine Nature Reserve	Ia	32,870	14 January 1992	31°11′35″S 119°38′58″E	COO
Yenyening Lakes Nature Reserve	Ia	3,098	3 June 1966	32°13′59″S 117°17′23″E	AVW
Yeo Lake Nature Reserve	Ia	321,946	14 September 1979	28°01′07″S 124°19′51″E	GVD
Yetterup Nature Reserve	Ia	115	26 August 1904	34°11′13″S 116°59′49″E	JAF
Yilgerin Nature Reserve	Ia	49	11 November 1977	32°00′43″S 118°09′14″E	AVW
Yilliminning Nature Reserve	Ia	40	24 December 1986	32°54′19″S 117°22′23″E	AVW
Yorkrakine Rock Nature Reserve	Ia	157	8 August 1952	31°25′18″S 117°30′51″E	AVW
Yornaning Nature Reserve	Ia	69	15 June 1934	32°44′47″S 117°10′33″E	AVW
Yurine Swamp Nature Reserve	Ia	30	31 March 1905	31°14′11″S 115°47′26″E	SWA
Zuytdorp Nature Reserve	Ia	65,141	15 July 1977	26°59′10″S 114°10′29″E	GES, YAL

=== Notes ===
- ^[1] Investigator Island Nature Reserve is located off the coast of the Esperance Plains bioregion.
- ^[2] Whalebone Island Nature Reserve is located off the coast of the Carnarvon xeric shrublands bioregion.

=== Key for IBRA ===
Interim Biogeographic Regionalisation for Australia:

- AVW: Avon Wheatbelt
- CAR: Carnarvon xeric shrublands
- CEK: Central Kimberley
- COO: Coolgardie bioregion
- DAL: Dampierland
- ESP: Esperance Plains
- GAS: Gascoyne bioregion
- GES: Geraldton Sandplains
- GID: Gibson Desert
- GSD: Great Sandy Desert
- GVD: Great Victoria Desert
- HAM: Hampton bioregion
- ITI: Indian Tropical Islands
- JAF: Jarrah Forest
- LSD: Little Sandy Desert
- MAL: Mallee bioregion
- MUR: Murchison (Western Australia)
- NOK: Northern Kimberley
- NUL: Nullarbor Plain
- OVP: Ord Victoria Plain
- PIL: Pilbara shrublands
- SWA: Swan Coastal Plain
- VIB: Victoria Bonaparte
- WAR: Warren bioregion
- YAL: Yalgoo bioregion

== See also ==
- List of unnamed nature reserves of Western Australia
- List of national parks of Western Australia
- List of conservation parks of Western Australia
- List of Indigenous Protected Areas of Western Australia
