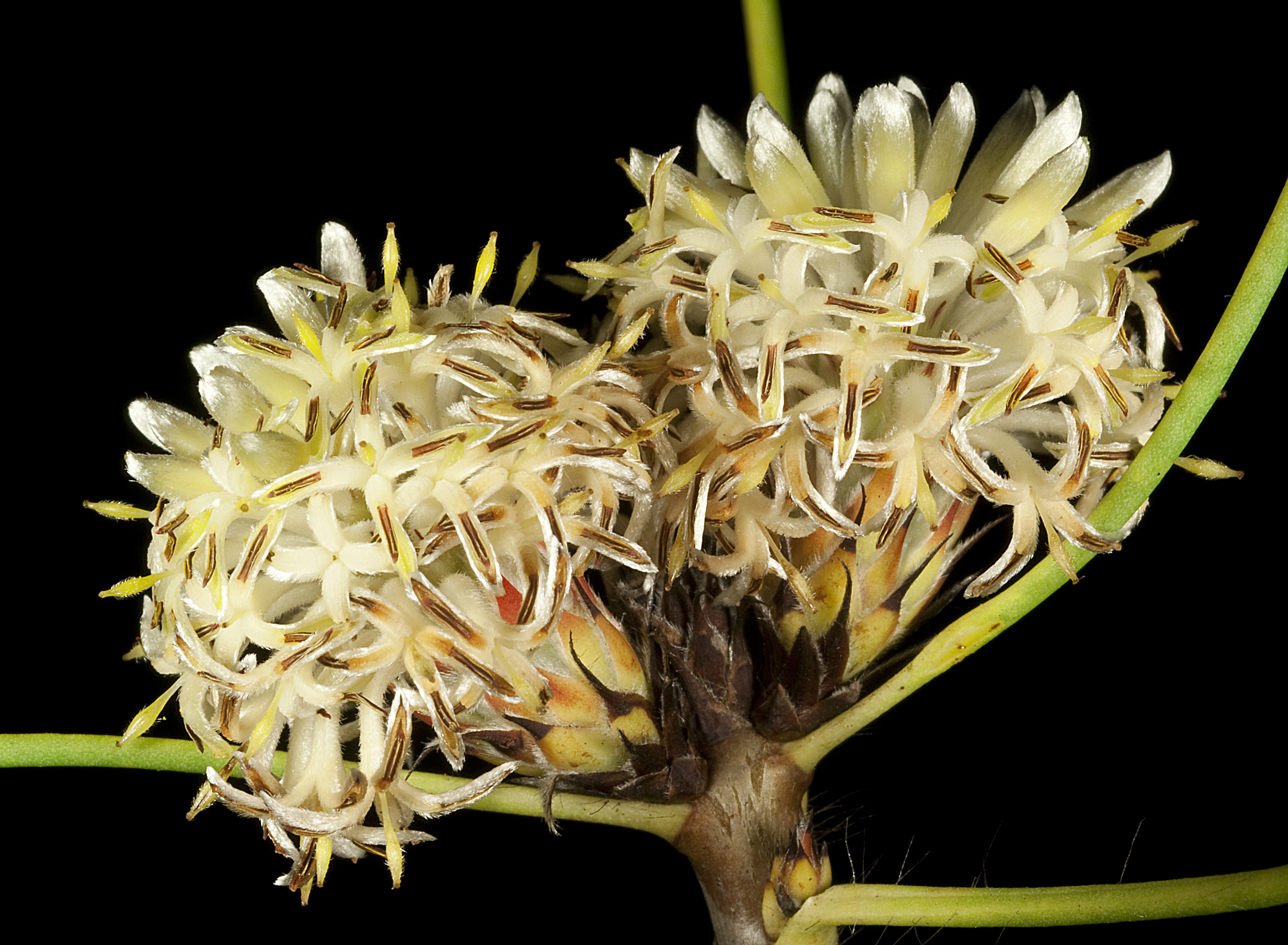

Scientific classification
- Kingdom: Plantae
- Clade: Tracheophytes
- Clade: Angiosperms
- Clade: Eudicots
- Order: Proteales
- Family: Proteaceae
- Genus: Petrophile
- Species: P. glauca

Binomial name
- Petrophile glauca Foreman

= Petrophile glauca =

Species of shrub endemic to Western Australia

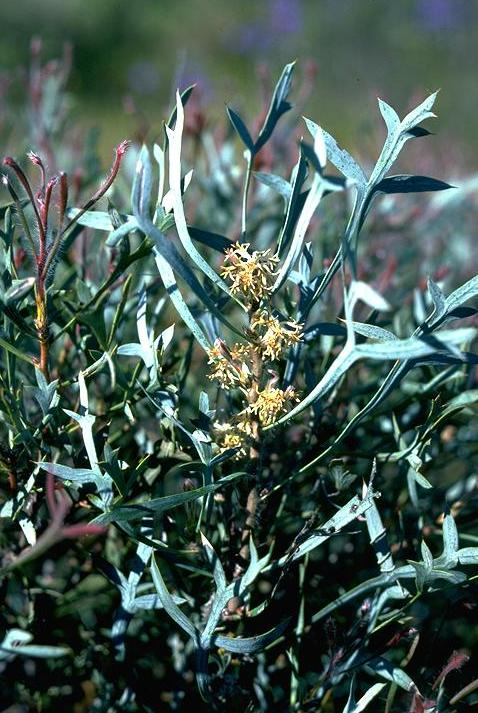
Foliage near Badjaling

Petrophile glauca is a species of flowering plant in the family Proteaceae and is endemic to southwestern Western Australia. It is a shrub with pinnately-divided, flattened, glaucous leaves and more or less spherical heads of hairy yellow to creamy-white flowers.

== Description ==
Petrophile glauca is a shrub that typically grows to a height of 0.5–1 m (1 ft 8 in – 3 ft 3 in) and has more or less glabrous young branchlets and leaves. The leaves are glaucous, flattened, 70–195 mm (2.8–7.7 in) long on a petiole 30–110 mm (1.2–4.3 in) long, pinnately divided to the midrib, with between seven and twelve pinnae about 25 mm (0.98 in) long. The flowers are arranged in leaf axils or on the ends of branchlets in sessile, more or less spherical heads about 14 mm (0.55 in) in diameter, with overlapping triangular involucral bracts at the base. The flowers are about 14 mm (0.55 in) long, yellow to creamy-white and hairy. Flowering mainly occurs from August to November and the fruit is a nut, fused with others in an oval to spherical head about 15 mm (0.59 in) in diameter.

== Taxonomy ==
Petrophile glauca was first formally described in 1995 by Donald Bruce Foreman in Flora of Australia from material collected by Neville Graeme Marchant in 1979. The specific epithet (glauca) means "having a bluish-grey bloom".

== Distribution and habitat ==
This petrophile grows in a variety of habitats on sandy-gravelly soils between Wagin, Lake King, the Frank Hann National Park, Corrigin and East Mount Barren in the Avon Wheatbelt, Coolgardie, Esperance Plains and Mallee biogeographic regions of southwestern Western Australia.

== Conservation status ==
Petrophile glauca is classified as "not threatened" by the Western Australian Government Department of Parks and Wildlife.
