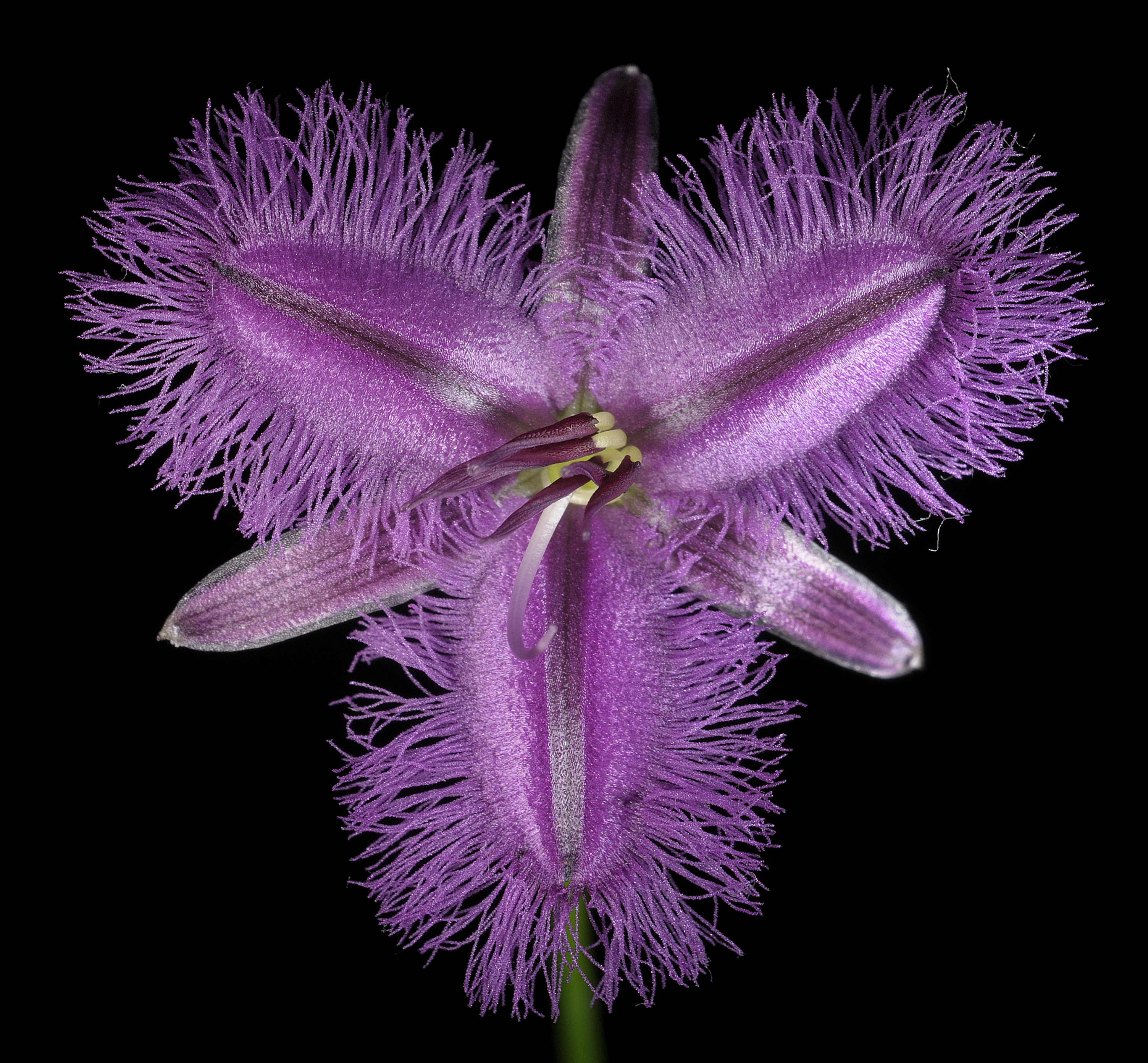

Scientific classification
- Kingdom: Plantae
- Clade: Tracheophytes
- Clade: Angiosperms
- Clade: Monocots
- Order: Asparagales
- Family: Asparagaceae
- Subfamily: Lomandroideae
- Genus: Thysanotus
- Species: T. dichotomus

Binomial name
- Thysanotus dichotomus (Labill.) R.Br.

Synonyms
- List: Chlamysporum dichotomum (Labill.) Kuntze; Ornithogalum dichotomum Labill.; Thysanotus dichotomus (Labill.) R.Br. var. dichotomus; Thysanotus dichotomus var. lindleyanus (Endl.) F.Muell. & Tate; Thysanotus divaricatus R.Br.; Thysanotus elongatus R.Br.; Thysanotus flexuosus R.Br.; Thysanotus intricatus Lindl.; Thysanotus lindleyanus Endl.

= Thysanotus dichotomus =

Species of plant

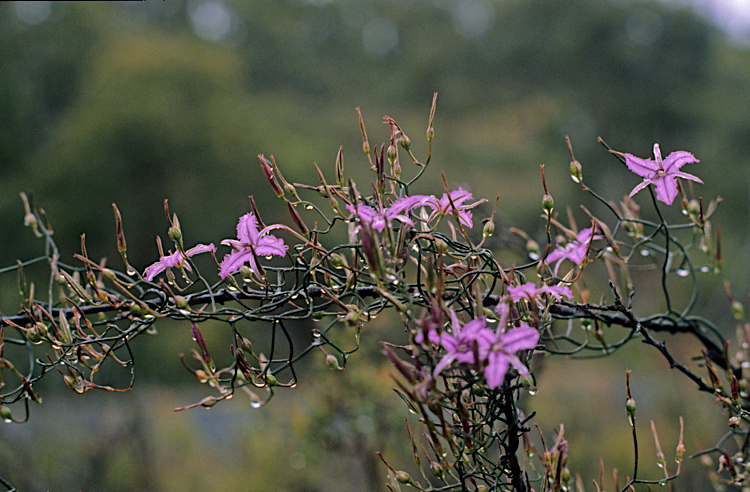
Habit in the Avon Valley

Thysanotus dichotomus, commonly known as branching fringe lily, is a species of flowering plant in the Asparagaceae family, and is endemic to the south-west of Western Australia. It is a rhizomatous, branched, perennial herb, with umbels of up to 3 purple flowers with oblong sepals, elliptic, fringed petals, six stamens and a curved style.

== Description ==
Thysanotus dichotomus is a perennial herb with more or less spherical rhizomes up to about 50 mm (2.0 in) in diameter. Its 5 to 10 leaves are produced annually, narrowly lance-shaped, 80–140 mm (3.1–5.5 in) long with a fringe of hairs on the edges, but the leaves usually wither before flowering. The flowering stems are perennial, up to 600 mm (24 in) long and branched. The flowers are purple and borne groups of up to 3 on a pedicel 6–10 mm (0.24–0.39 in) long, the perianth segments 10–18 mm (0.39–0.71 in) long. The sepals are oblong, 1.5–3 mm (0.059–0.118 in) wide, the petals elliptic, 5–7 mm (0.20–0.28 in) wide with a fringe 2.0–3.5 mm (0.079–0.138 in) wide. There are six stamens, the anthers of different lengths, and the style curved, 6–9 mm (0.24–0.35 in) long. Flowering occurs from September to December or January, and the seeds are more or less cylindrical, about 2 mm (0.079 in) long and 1 mm (0.039 in) in diameter with a pale, yellowish aril.

== Taxonomy ==
This species was first formally described in 1805 by Jacques Labillardière who gave it the name Ornithogalum dichotomum in his Novae Hollandiae Plantarum Specimen. In 1810, Robert Brown transferred it to the genus, Thysanotus as T. dichotomus.

== Distribution and habitat ==
Branching fringe lily is found from near Geraldton to east of Esperance in the Avon Wheatbelt, Esperance Plains, Geraldton Sandplains, Jarrah Forest, Mallee, Swan Coastal Plain, Warren and Yalgoo bioregions of south-western Western Australia. Along the Darling Range it grows in jarrah-marri forest on soils derived from granite, or with granite rocks in drier inland areas.

== Conservation status ==
Thysanotus dichotomus is listed as "not threatened" by the Government of Western Australia Department of Biodiversity, Conservation and Attractions.
