= Pallinup, Western Australia =

Locality in the Shire of Gnowangerup, Western Australia

Pallinup
- other
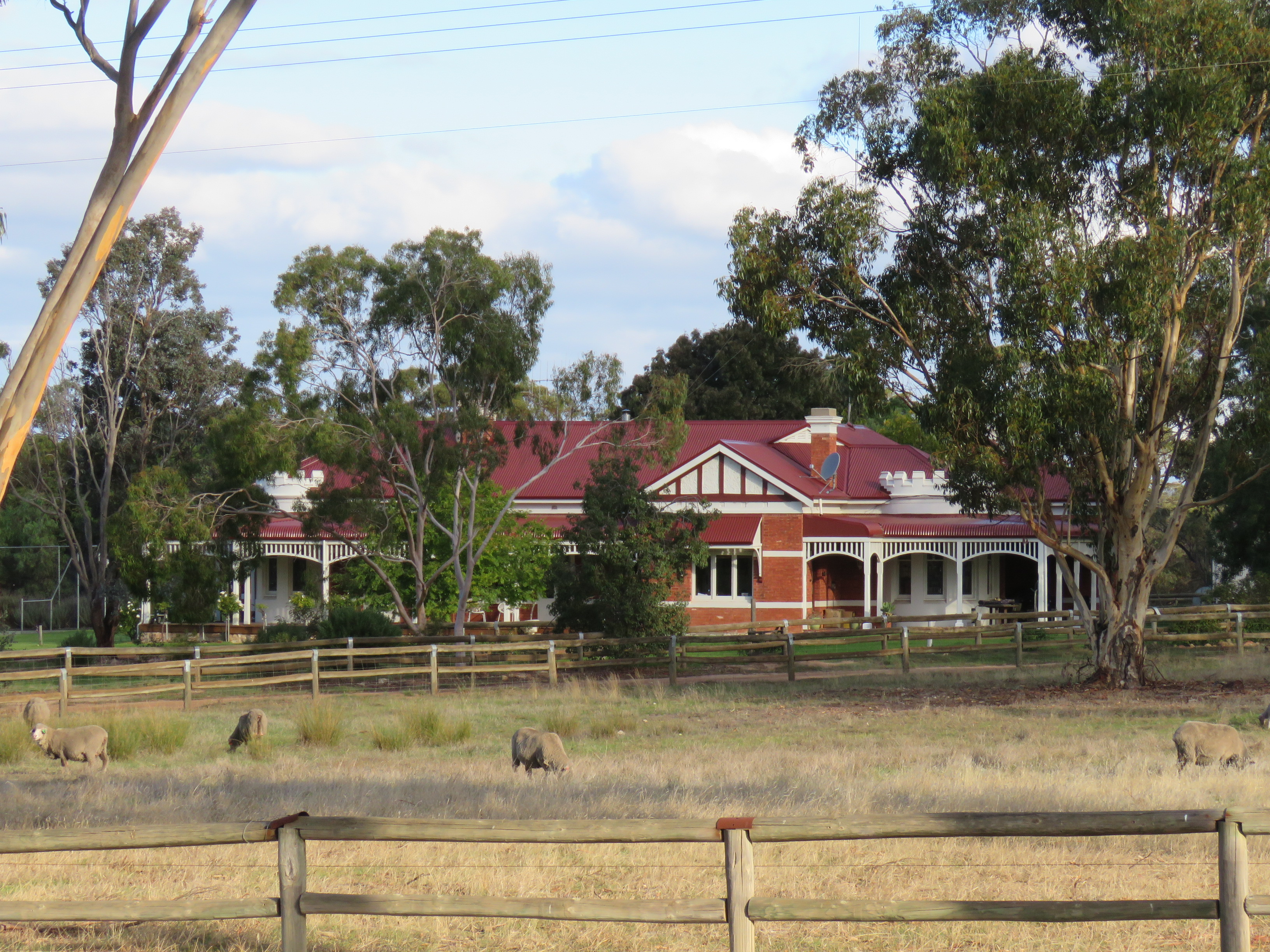
- The state heritage listed Telyarup Homestead in Pallinup

- Coordinates: 33.91331°S 117.89064°E
- Country: Australia
- State: Western Australia
- LGA: Shire of Gnowangerup
- Location: 298 km (185 mi) SE of Perth; 121 km (75 mi) NE of Albany; 4 km (2.5 mi) SW of Gnowangerup

Government
  - State electorate: Roe
  - Federal division: O'Connor

Area
  - Total: 385.5 km^{2} (148.8 sq mi)

Population
  - Total: 90 (SAL 2021)
- Postcode: 6335
Localities around Pallinup
Coyrecup	Nyabing	Nyabing
Broomehill East	Pallinup	Jackitup
Lake Toolbrunup	North Stirlings	Kebaringup

Pallinup is a rural locality of the Shire of Gnowangerup in the Great Southern region of Western Australia. Pallinup borders the townsite of Gnowangerup to the east, while the Pallinup River runs through the south-west of the locality. Gnowangerup Airport is located in Pallinup.

== History ==
Pallinup is located on the traditional land of the Koreng people of the Noongar nation.

The Pallinup Estate was originally privately owned from the 1880s, first by Lord Brassey, an investor in the Western Australian Land Company, then James Munroe and, finally, until its purchase by the government, David Stewart. Plans to subdivide the estate into individual farms were already made in 1892. At this point, the estate was owned by Thomas Wilde Powell.

Pallinup was once a siding on the Tambellup to Ongerup railway line, open from 1912 to 1978. The site of the Pallinup Siding is listed on the shire's heritage register, but nothing remains of the former railway siding.

In the post-First World War era, Pallinup was developed as a soldier settlement scheme and was considered prosperous and successful. The Pallinup Estate was purchased for this purpose by the Land Resumption Board in April 1919.

Gnowangerup Airport is also on the shire's heritage list. It is the second airfield used in Gnowangerup, an earlier one having been built by hand, and is used by the Royal Flying Doctor Service.

Also heritage listed, the site of the Pallinup School commemorates the local two-room school that operated from 1925 to 1947, after which the school children travelled by bus to Gnowangerup to attend school there. At its peak, the school had 48 pupils.

The Telyarup Homestead is on the Western Australian State Register of Heritage Places and dates back to 1910. The homestead is and example of the Federation Queen Anne style type of architecture.

== Horsepower Highway ==
The Broonhill-Gnowangerup Road and Formby Road South, which pass through and border Pallinup, are part of the Horsepower Highway, which originates in Broomehill and carries on to the neighbouring Shire of Gnowangerup. It is a 75-kilometre (47 mi) long tourist route. It displays vintage tractors and other artworks and finishes at the border of Stirling Range National Park.
