= North Stirlings, Western Australia =

Locality in the Shire of Gnowangerup, Western Australia

North Stirlings
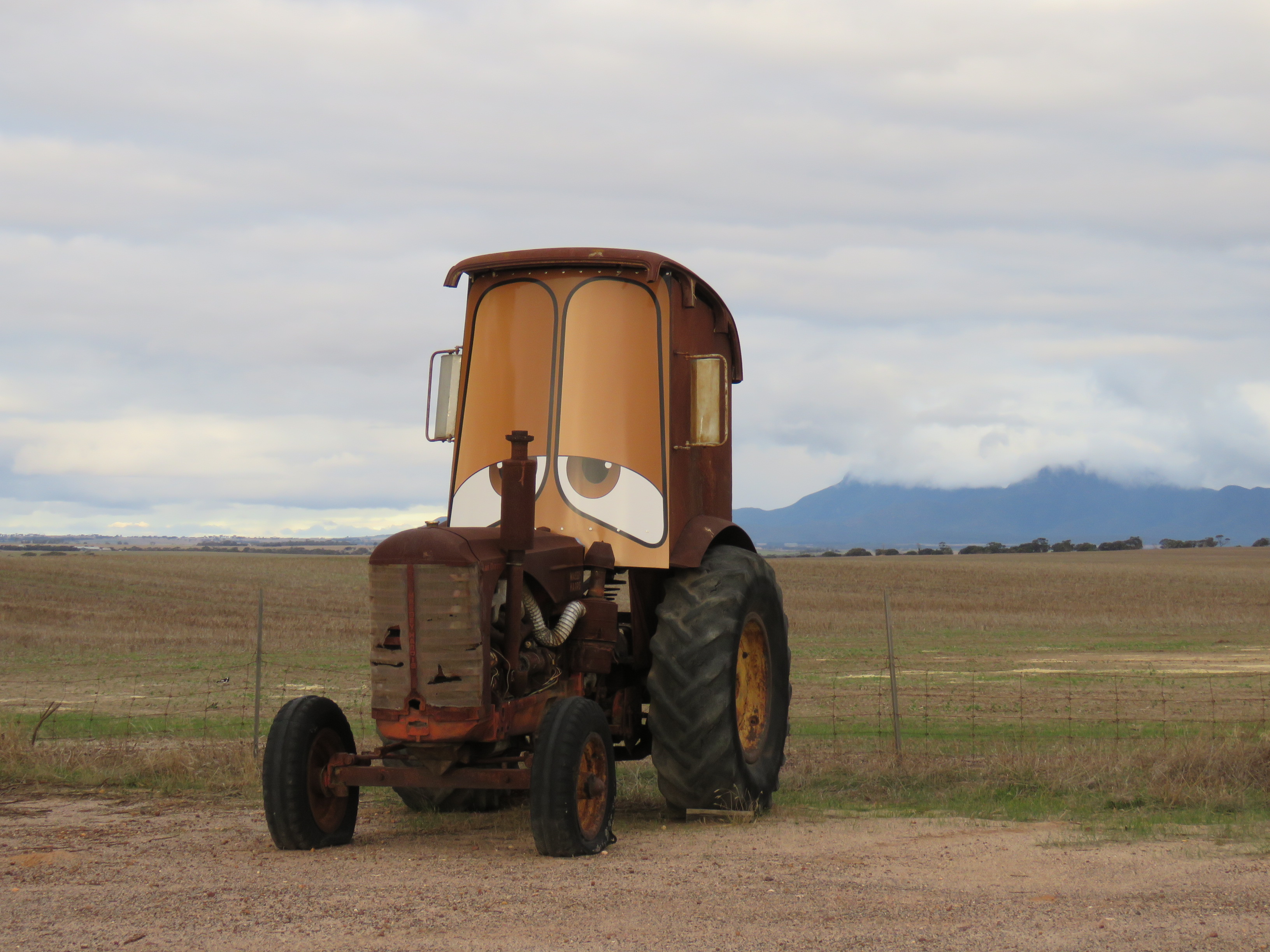
- DIESEL, a country cow on Formby Road South, the local section of the Horsepower Highway, with the Stirling Range in the background

- Interactive map of North Stirlings
- Coordinates: 34.21737°S 118.03296°E
- Country: Australia
- State: Western Australia
- LGA: Shire of Gnowangerup
- Location: 326 km (203 mi) SE of Perth; 90 km (56 mi) N of Albany; 32 km (20 mi) S of Gnowangerup

Government
  - State electorate: Roe
  - Federal division: O'Connor

Area
  - Total: 247.2 km^{2} (95.4 sq mi)

Population
  - Total: 26 (SAL 2021)
- Postcode: 6338
Localities around North Stirlings
Lake Toolbrunup	Pallinup	Magitup
Lake Toolbrunup	North Stirlings	Magitup
Cranbrook	Stirling Range NP	Amelup

North Stirlings is a rural locality of the Shire of Gnowangerup in the Great Southern region of Western Australia. It borders Stirling Range National Park to the south. All of Formby Nature Reserve and the eastern part of the Camel Lake Nature Reserve are located within the south of North Stirlings.

== History ==
North Stirlings is located on the traditional land of the Koreng people of the Noongar nation.

== Horsepower Highway ==
Formby Road South, which passes through and borders North Stirlings, is part of the Horsepower Highway, which originates in Broomehill and carries on to the neighbouring Shire of Gnowangerup. It is a 75-kilometre (47 mi) long tourist route. It displays vintage tractors and other artworks and finishes at the border of Stirling Range National Park.

== Nature reserves ==
The Camel Lake Nature Reserve was gazetted on 12 January 1962, has a size of 32.15 square kilometres (12.41 mi^{2}), and is located within the Esperance Plains bioregion. The nature reserve directly borders Stirling Range National Park.

The Formby Nature Reserve was gazetted on 16 September 1904, has a size of 0.38 square kilometres (0.15 mi^{2}), and is also located within the Esperance Plains bioregion.
