= Moondyne Nature Reserve =

Nature reserve in Western Australia

- IUCN category Ia (strict nature reserve)
- Location within Western Australia
- Location: Western Australia
- Nearest city: Toodyay
- Coordinates: 31°34′05″S 116°12′43″E
- Area: 1,934 ha (7.47 sq mi)
- Established: 1970

Moondyne Nature Reserve is a reserve located within the Avon Valley National Park, in the Avon Valley, Western Australia.

Considered and reviewed in 1979 and 1980, it was established in 1981.

A guide was published in 1984 as to the features within the reserve.

A trip into the reserve area in 2013, was considered to one of the events that contributed to the establishment of the Toodyaypedia project.
