= Lake Toolbrunup, Western Australia =

Locality in the Shire of Broomehill-Tambellup, Western Australia

Lake Toolbrunup
- Interactive map of Lake Toolbrunup
- Coordinates: 34.11072°S 117.90430°E
- Country: Australia
- State: Western Australia
- LGA: Shire of Broomehill–Tambellup
- Location: 308 km (191 mi) SE of Perth; 100 km (62 mi) N of Albany; 58 km (36 mi) SE of Katanning

Government
  - State electorate: Roe
  - Federal division: O'Connor

Area
  - Total: 411.2 km^{2} (158.8 sq mi)

Population
  - Total: 76 (SAL 2021)
- Postcode: 6320
Localities around Lake Toolbrunup
Dartnall	Dartnall	Pallinup
Wansbrough	Lake Toolbrunup	North Stirlings
Cranbrook	Cranbrook	North Stirlings

Lake Toolbrunup is a rural locality of the Shire of Broomehill–Tambellup in the Great Southern region of Western Australia. The Anderson Lake and the Three Swamps Nature Reserves are located within Lake Toolbrunup.

Toolbrunup Peak is the name of a mountain in the Stirling Range, which is south of the locality.

== History ==
Lake Toolbrunup is located on the traditional lands of the Koreng people of the Noongar nation.

Toolbrunup was a siding on the Tambellup to Ongerup railway line, with the siding opening in 1912 and closing in 1981, but the location of this siding is to the north of the current locality, in Dartnall. The site of the Toolbrunup railway siding is now on the shire's heritage list.

The former Toolbrunup School, in the north-west of the current locality, was opened in 1903, expanded in 1918 and closed 30 years later. It is heritage listed as a rare surviving example of a one teacher school.

== Nature reserves ==
The Anderson Lake Nature Reserve was gazetted on 5 December 1958, has a size of 4.79 square kilometres (1.85 mi^{2}), and is located within the Mallee bioregion.

The Three Swamps Nature Reserve was gazetted on 12 January 1962, has a size of 3.57 square kilometres (1.38 mi^{2}), and is also located within the Mallee bioregion.
