= Badjaling, Western Australia =

Town in the Wheatbelt region of Western Australia

Badjaling
- Town
- Coordinates: 31.997°S 117.499°E
- Country: Australia
- State: Western Australia
- LGA(s): Shire of Quairading
- Location: 178 km (111 mi) east of Perth; 10 km (6.2 mi) east of Quairading; 51 km (32 mi) north west of Corrigin
- Established: 1914

Government
  - State electorate(s): Central Wheatbelt
  - Federal division(s): O'Connor

Area
  - Total: 84.2 km^{2} (32.5 sq mi)
- Elevation: 230 m (750 ft)

Population
  - Total(s): 26 (SAL 2021)
- Postcode: 6383

Badjaling is a small town in the Wheatbelt region of Western Australia located close to the Salt River, and is approximately 155 kilometres (96 mi) east of Perth.

== History ==
The townsite was originally declared as Yuruga in 1914 but the name was changed to Badjaling later the same year. The word Badjalling is the Aboriginal name for the nearby soak and springs. Badjal means the feathers discarded as a bird is plucked.

In 1932, the Wheat Pool of Western Australia announced that the town would have two grain elevators, each fitted with an engine, installed at the railway siding of the York–Bruce Rock railway line.

The railway siding was the usual location of departure for the annual Stacey lamb train carrying several thousand lambs raised by L J Stacy of Quairading to Robbs Jetty Abattoir.

== Geography ==
The Pink Lake of Quairading is actually at Badjaling, with the main road, Bruce Rock–Quairading Road, crossing it.

== See also ==
- Badjaling Nature Reserve
