= Avon Valley National Park =

National park in Western Australia

- IUCN category II (national park)
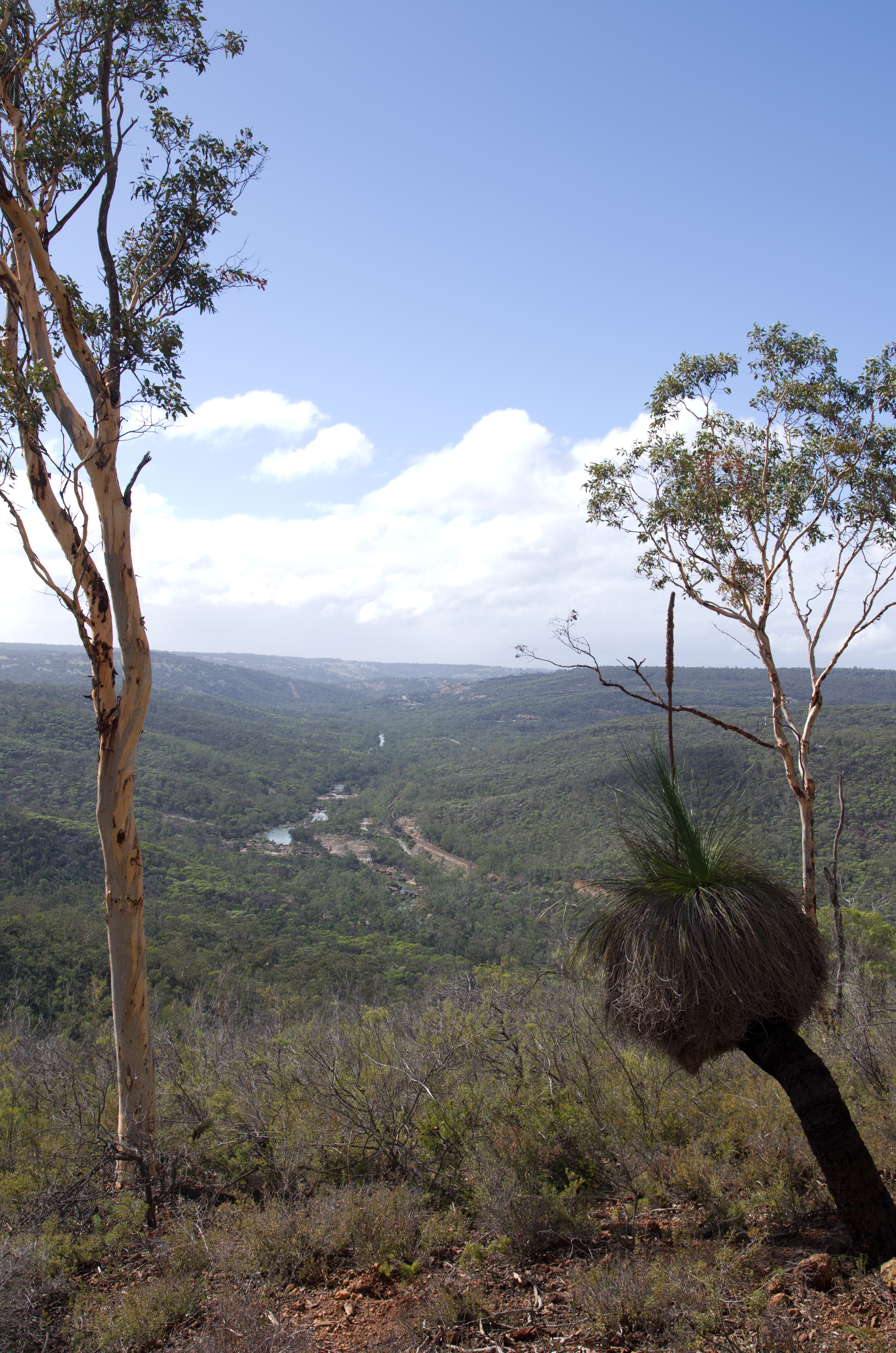
- Avon river and Eastern Railway passing through the Avon Valley National Park

- Location within Western Australia
- Location: Western Australia
- Nearest city: Toodyay
- Coordinates: 31°37′30″S 116°11′01″E
- Area: 43.66 km^{2} (16.86 sq mi)
- Established: 1970
- Governing body: Parks and Wildlife Service
- Website: http://parks.dpaw.wa.gov.au/park/avon-valley

Avon Valley is a national park in Western Australia, 47 kilometres northeast of Perth. It was named after the Avon River, which flows through it. The area is an undulating plateau with the sides of the valley steeply sloping back to the river approximately 200 metres (660 ft) below. The area contains granite outcrops and a mix of soil types including loams, gravels and lateritic sands.

There is also an eponymous locality of the City of Swan, but the boundaries of the national park and the locality are not identical.

== Description ==
It was officially named on 15 October 1971.

Jarrah, marri and wandoo trees are found in the park along with 90 different species of birds, making it an ideal place for bird watching. Christmas trees and grasstrees are interspersed through the woodlands.

In the springtime the park is visited by wildflower enthusiasts to view the diverse range of flowers, including dryandras, donkey orchids and lechenaultias. Other plants found in the area are Conostylis, and the rare fringed lily is also found within the park.

The bushranger Moondyne Joe used the area as a hide-out with his cave and corral situated within the park boundaries. Both have since been damaged by a series of bushfires within the park. The area was subsequently designated as a reserve within the National Park in the Moondyne Nature Reserve in 1981.

The third route of the Eastern Railway is in parts the southern border of the park, on the southern side of the Avon River, and provides - at times of bushfires and other emergencies - a track and point of access.

== Facilities ==
Entry and camping fees apply for visitors to the park. Toilets, water, shaded areas and wood barbecues are available for use. Trail signage and an information shelter are located within the park and a dedicated ranger is on site ( No longer on site).

== See also ==
- List of national parks of Australia
