= Gnowellen, Western Australia =

Locality in the City of Albany, Western Australia

Gnowellen
- Interactive map of Gnowellen
- Coordinates: 34°23′56″S 118°35′3″E
- Country: Australia
- State: Western Australia
- LGA: City of Albany
- Location: 442.5 km (275.0 mi) SE of Perth; 185.9 km (115.5 mi) SE of Kojonup; 113.3 km (70.4 mi) SW of Albany

Government
  - State electorate: Albany
  - Federal division: O'Connor

Area
  - Total: 362.1 km^{2} (139.8 sq mi)

Population
  - Total: 30 (2021)
  - Density: 0.083/km^{2} (0.21/sq mi)
- Postcode: 6328

Gnowellen is a locality of the City of Albany in the Great Southern region of Western Australia. It borders the Stirling Range National Park in the west while the Pallinup River forms its northern border. The Pallinup Nature Reserve is located in the south-eastern corner of Gnowellen, while the Mailalup Nature Reserve is in its west.

== Demographics ==
As of the 2021 Australian census, 30 people resided in Gnowellen, up from 26 in the 2016 census. The median age of persons in Gnowellen was 33 years. There were more males than females, with 65.7% of the population male and 34.3% female. The average household size was 2.4 people per household.

== Nature reserves ==
The Pallinup Nature Reserve was gazetted on 4 August 1967, has a size of 4.25 square kilometres (1.64 mi^{2}), and is located within the Esperance Plains bioregion.

The Mailalup Nature Reserve was gazetted on 4 May 1962, has a size of 7.68 square kilometres (2.97 mi^{2}), and is also located within the Esperance Plains bioregion.
