= Nallian Nature Reserve =

Nature reserve in Western Australia

- IUCN category Ia (strict nature reserve)
- Location within Western Australia
- Location: Western Australia
- Nearest city: Wagin
- Coordinates: 33.22996°S 117.43565°E
- Area: 97 ha (240 acres)
- Established: 1897

The Nallian Nature Reserve is located approximately fifteen kilometres north east of Wagin, Western Australia.

It is home to a range of local animals and plants such as kangaroos and native grasses and also introduced species such as foxes and rabbits.

It is accessed off a track running north from Nallian Road.
