= Badjaling Nature Reserve =

Nature reserve in Western Australia

- IUCN category Ia (strict nature reserve)
- Location within Western Australia
- Location: Western Australia
- Nearest city: Quairading
- Coordinates: 31°59′21″S 117°29′56″E
- Area: 241 ha (600 acres)
- Established: 1953
- Governing body: Department of Biodiversity, Conservation and Attractions

Badjaling Nature Reserve is a nature reserve managed by the Department of Parks and Wildlife, located at Badjaling in the Wheatbelt region of Western Australia. Located east of Quairading, it is a reserve of native bushland, surrounded by land long since cleared for agriculture.

The reserve, established in 1953, has a size of 241 hectares (600 acres). Apart from Badjaling Nature Reserve, two smaller nature reserves exist nearby, the Badjaling North Nature Reserve (58 hectares (140 acres), established 1906) and Badjaling West Nature Reserve (56 hectares (140 acres), established 1966).

Vegetation consists of shrubland (54%), woodland (32%), a complex of halophytes occurring in a saline watercourse (11%), and a small amount of heath (3%). The woodland is mostly composed of low, shrublike trees of Banksia and Xylomelum. A 1980 survey recorded 111 plant species in the reserve, but this did not include the endangered Banksia cuneata (Quairading Banksia), which was discovered there in 1971 but not published until 1981.

The mammal fauna of the reserve is impoverished. The only native species recorded there are the common dunnart and Gould's wattled bat. The introduced house mouse, black rat, European rabbit and fox have also been recorded. 64 bird species have been recorded, comprising 37 passerines and 27 non-passerines. 5 frogs species are known, and 17 reptiles.
