= Dunn Rock and Lake King Important Bird Area =

Important Bird Area in Western Australia

Coordinates: 33°14′10″S 119°31′19″E

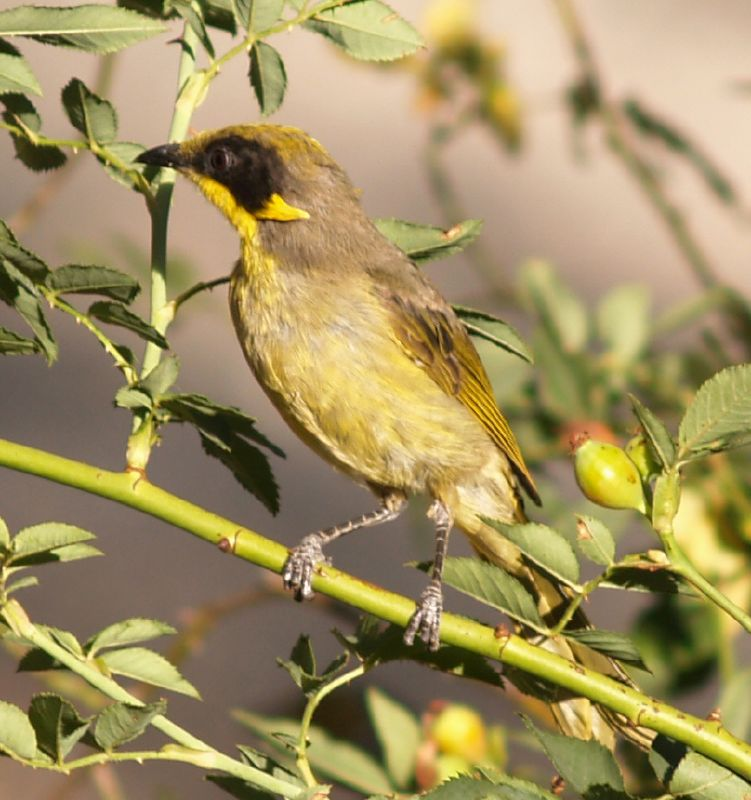
The IBA is an important site for the purple-gaped honeyeater

The Dunn Rock and Lake King Important Bird Area is a 759 km^{2} irregularly shaped tract of land in the south-eastern wheatbelt region of Western Australia. It lies about 380 km south-east of Perth and 250 km north-east of Albany.

== Description ==
The boundaries of the Important Bird Area (IBA) are defined by the remnant native vegetation associated with Pallarup, Dunn Rock, and Lake King Nature Reserves and adjacent unallocated Crown Land. It is surrounded by land cleared for farming. The site is one of the largest remaining mallee remnants within the wheatbelt, containing plant communities that have largely been cleared elsewhere. It consists mainly of mallee, mallee-heath, and salt pans and receives around 400 mm of rain annually.

== Birds ==
The IBA contains the core habitat for the malleefowl and supports a significant species population. Other birds for which the IBA is an important site include the Carnaby's cockatoo, red-capped parrot, western rosella, regent parrot, blue-breasted fairywren, purple-gaped honeyeater, and western yellow robin.
