= Truslove, Western Australia =

Former town in the Shire of Esperance, Western Australia

Truslove
- Town
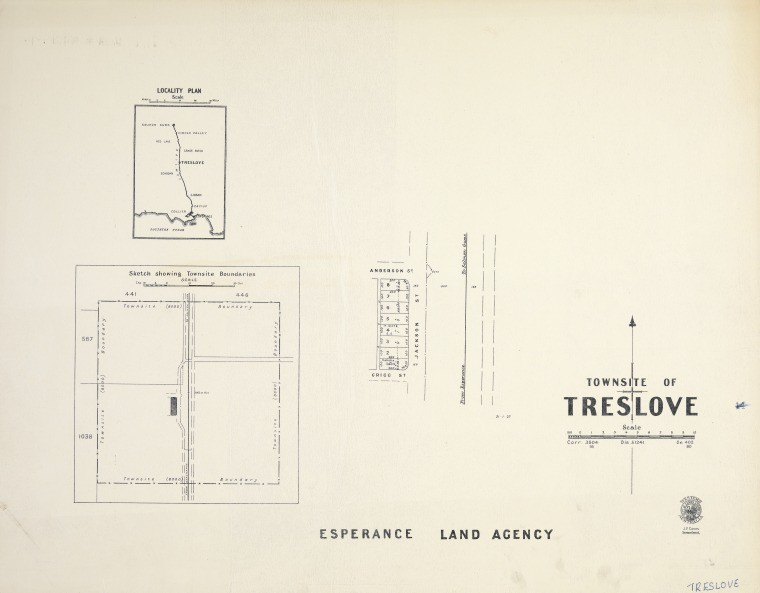
- A 1927 map of the townsite of Truslove

- Interactive map of Truslove
- Coordinates: 33.34265°S 121.71678°E
- Country: Australia
- State: Western Australia
- LGA: Shire of Esperance
- Location: 570 km (350 mi) E of Perth; 127 km (79 mi) S of Norseman; 60 km (37 mi) N of Esperance
- Established: 1927
- Abolished: 1976

Government
  - State electorate: Roe
  - Federal division: O'Connor
- Postcode: 6446

Truslove, originally spelled Treslove, is a former town in the Shire of Esperance in the Goldfields-Esperance region of Western Australia. It was situated within the locality of Grass Patch, on the Coolgardie-Esperance Highway. The area around the former townsite is now covered by the Truslove North and Truslove Townsite Nature Reserves.

Originally established as a siding on the Norseman to Esperance railway in 1925, under the name of Treslove, it was gazetted as a townsite in 1927 and renamed to Truslove in 1933. An official 1927 map of the townsite shows the town west of the railway line and consisting of the north–south running Jackson Street and the east–west running Anderson and Grigg Streets, with eight blocks of land allocated along them. The railway siding was closed in 1970.

The Truslove North Nature Reserve was gazetted on 5 October 1917 and has a size of 1.94 square kilometres (0.75 mi^{2}). The Truslove Townsite Nature Reserve was gazetted on 4 February 1966 and has a size of 60.66 square kilometres (23.42 mi^{2}). Both are located within the Mallee bioregion:

The Truslove townsite was officially cancelled in April 1976.
