= Muehlenbeckia horrida subsp. abdita =

Remote thorny lignum

Conservation status
- Critically endangered (EPBC Act)

Scientific classification
- Kingdom: Plantae
- Clade: Tracheophytes
- Clade: Angiosperms
- Clade: Eudicots
- Order: Caryophyllales
- Family: Polygonaceae
- Genus: Muehlenbeckia
- Species: M. horrida
- Subspecies: M. h. subsp. abdita

Trinomial name
- Muehlenbeckia horrida subsp. abdita (K.L.Wilson)

Subspecies of shrub

Muehlenbeckia horrida subsp. abdita (syn. Duma horrida subsp. abdita). commonly known as remote thorny lignum, is a critically endangered shrub endemic to Western Australia.

== Description ==
It is an upright, spreading, leafless shrub, that grows to a height of from 60 to 120 centimetres. It has bright, light yellow clusters of flowers.

The subspecies was described in 1996 by Karen Wilson.

== Distribution and habitat ==
Muehlenbckia horrida subsp. abdita is known only from two populations within the Lake Bryde-East Lake Bryde wetland, in the Western Mallee subregion of the Mallee region in the South West Botanical Province of Western Australia.

It grows in waterlogged silt and sand, on the beds of Lake Bryde and East Lake Bryde. It depends for its survival upon a regular cycle of freshwater flooding followed by drying of the lake bed.

== Conservation ==
Populations of M. h. subsp. abdita have declined severely in the last thirty years, mainly because of increasing salinity. Salinity loads in the Lakes were measured at around 160 tonnes in 1985, but had increased to around 1200 tonnes in 2005. This increase is attributable to a rising water table caused by widespread clearing for agriculture. Other threats include interruption of the flooding/drying regime because of altered hydrology; and recreational activities such as water skiing. It is estimated that there are about 2000 plants left. There was previously a third population, but these were all dead in 2002, and the population is thought to be unrecoverable.

It is listed as "critically endangered" under Australia's Environment Protection and Biodiversity Conservation Act 1999, and as "Rare" under Western Australia's Wildlife Conservation Act 1950. The whole lake bed ecosystem has been classified as a critically endangered threatened ecological community under the name Bryde.
