= Lake Bryde-East Lake Bryde =

Wetland system in Western Australia

- Location in Western Australia
- Interactive map of Lake Bryde-East Lake Bryde
- Location: Great Southern, Western Australia
- Coordinates: 33°21′S 118°49′E
- Type: Wetlands
- Basin countries: Australia
- Designation: Lake Bryde Nature Reserve
- Surface area: 1.9 km^{2} (0.73 sq mi)

Lake Bryde-East Lake Bryde is a DIWA-listed freshwater wetland system in the Great Southern region of Western Australia. The system consists of two lakes: Lake Bryde, with an area of 50 hectares (120 acres); and East Lake Bryde, with an area of about 1.4 square kilometres (0.54 sq mi). They are located at the head of a chain of lakes that extend to Lake Magenta, and ultimately form part of the Swan-Avon drainage system.

== Description ==
The system is situated in the Shire of Kent, 34 kilometres (21 mi) south-west of Newdegate. It in part of the Western Mallee biogeographic subregion of the Mallee region of the South West Botanic Province.

The Lake Bryde-East Lake Bryde system contains the only shrub-dominated lake bed vegetation community in the province. This community, which consists mainly of the critically endangered Muehlenbeckia horrida subsp. abdita (remote thorny lignum) and Tecticornia verrucosa, has been declared a critically endangered threatened ecological community under the name "Bryde".

The lakes experience a regular cycle of freshwater flooding followed by gradual drying, and their vegetation depends upon that cycle for its survival. Since the 1980s, rises in the water table caused by extensive land clearing for agriculture has resulted in greatly increased salinity of the area, increasing the lakes' salt load from 160 tons to around 1200 tons. Furthermore, changes to the area's hydrology have greatly increased the frequency of flooding. These factors have caused a severe decline in the extent and condition of the shrub beds. Because of the threat to M. h. subsp. abdita and the ecological community as a whole, the lakes are protected by the Lake Bryde Nature Reserve.

The Lake Bryde Nature Reserve was gazetted on 15 March 1968 and has a size of 16.35 square kilometres (6.31 mi^{2}).

The lake system has been identified as important to bird life, with sixteen bird species recorded there. It has also been found to support a substantially greater diversity of aquatic invertebrates than surrounding lake systems.

== See also ==
- List of lakes of Australia § Western Australia
