= MAL2 =

MAL2 may refer to:

- MAL2 (gene)
- Region code for Western Mallee, subregion of Western Australia
- Mal-2 or Malaclypse the Younger (1941-2000), Discordian writer
- Mal/2, 1957 album by Mal Waldron
