= List of threatened ecological communities of Western Australia =

A series of threatened ecological communities of the Swan Coastal Plain and Western Australia, were identified in December 2006.

- Banksia attenuata woodland over species rich dense shrublands
- Perched wetlands of the Wheatbelt region with extensive stands of living Swamp Sheoak (Casuarina obesa) and Paperbark (Melaleuca strobophylla) across the lake floor
- Shrublands on southern Swan Coastal Plain Ironstones (Busselton area)
- Sedgelands in Holocene dune swales of the southern Swan Coastal Plain
- Stromatolite like freshwater microbialite community of coastal brackish lakes
- Stromatolite like microbialite community of coastal freshwater lakes
- Communities of Tumulus Springs (Organic Mound Springs, Swan Coastal Plain)
- Shrublands and woodlands of the eastern side of the Swan Coastal Plain
- Perth to Gingin Ironstone Association
- Shrublands and woodlands on Muchea Limestone
- Rimstone Pools and Cave Structures Formed by Microbial Activity on Marine Shorelines
- Callitris preissii (or Melaleuca lanceolata) forests and woodlands, Swan Coastal Plain
- Shrublands on calcareous silts of the Swan Coastal Plain
- Southern wet shrublands, Swan Coastal Plain
