= Western Mallee =

Biioregion in Western Australia

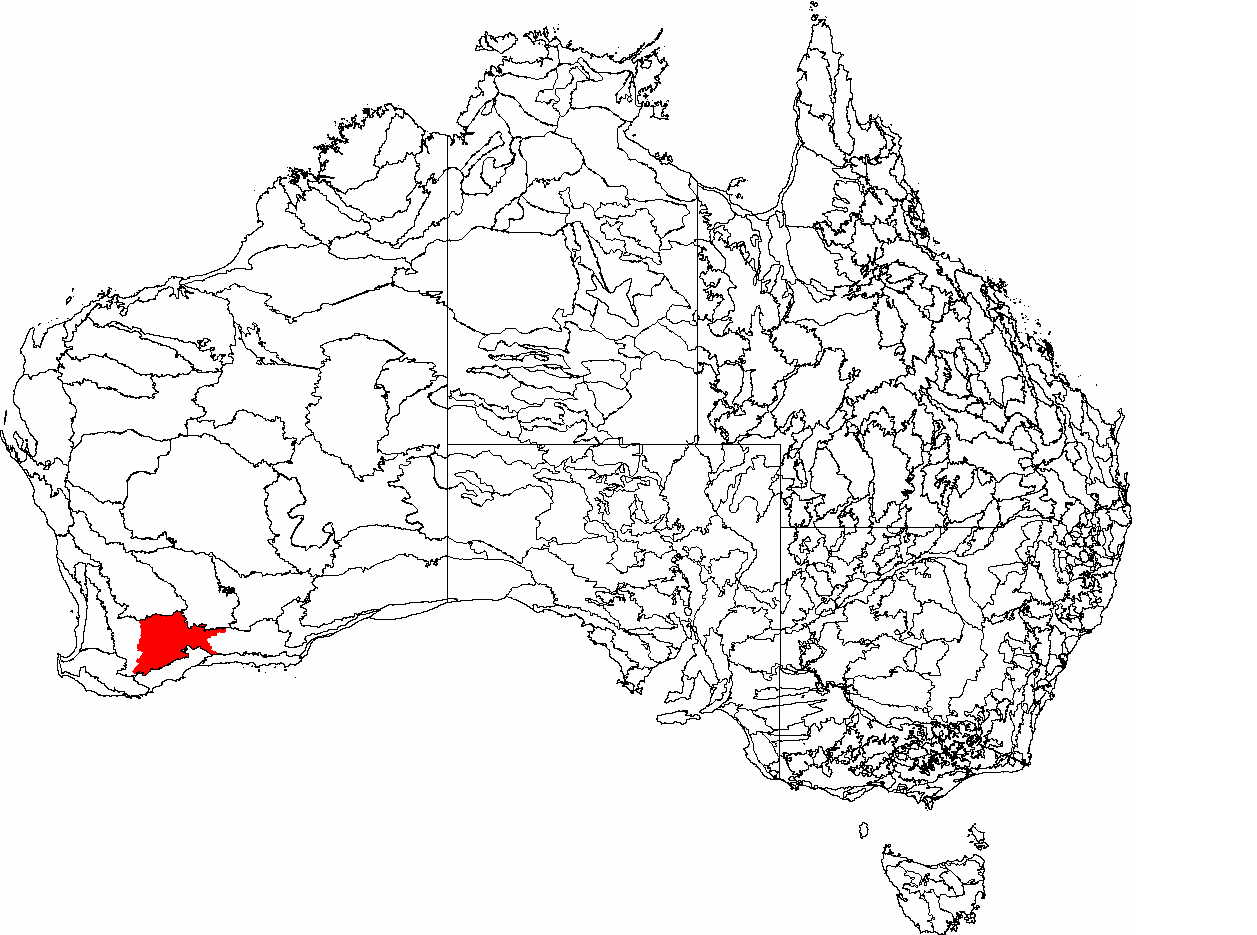
The IBRA subregions, with Western Mallee in red

Western Mallee is an Interim Biogeographic Regionalisation for Australia (IBRA) subregion in southern Western Australia. It is a sparsely populated subregion with an area of about 47,000 square kilometres, roughly centred on the town of Newdegate. Largely cleared for intensive agriculture, it still retains patches of native vegetation. These patches are under environmental stress from threats such as rising salinity, and are poorly managed.

== Geography ==
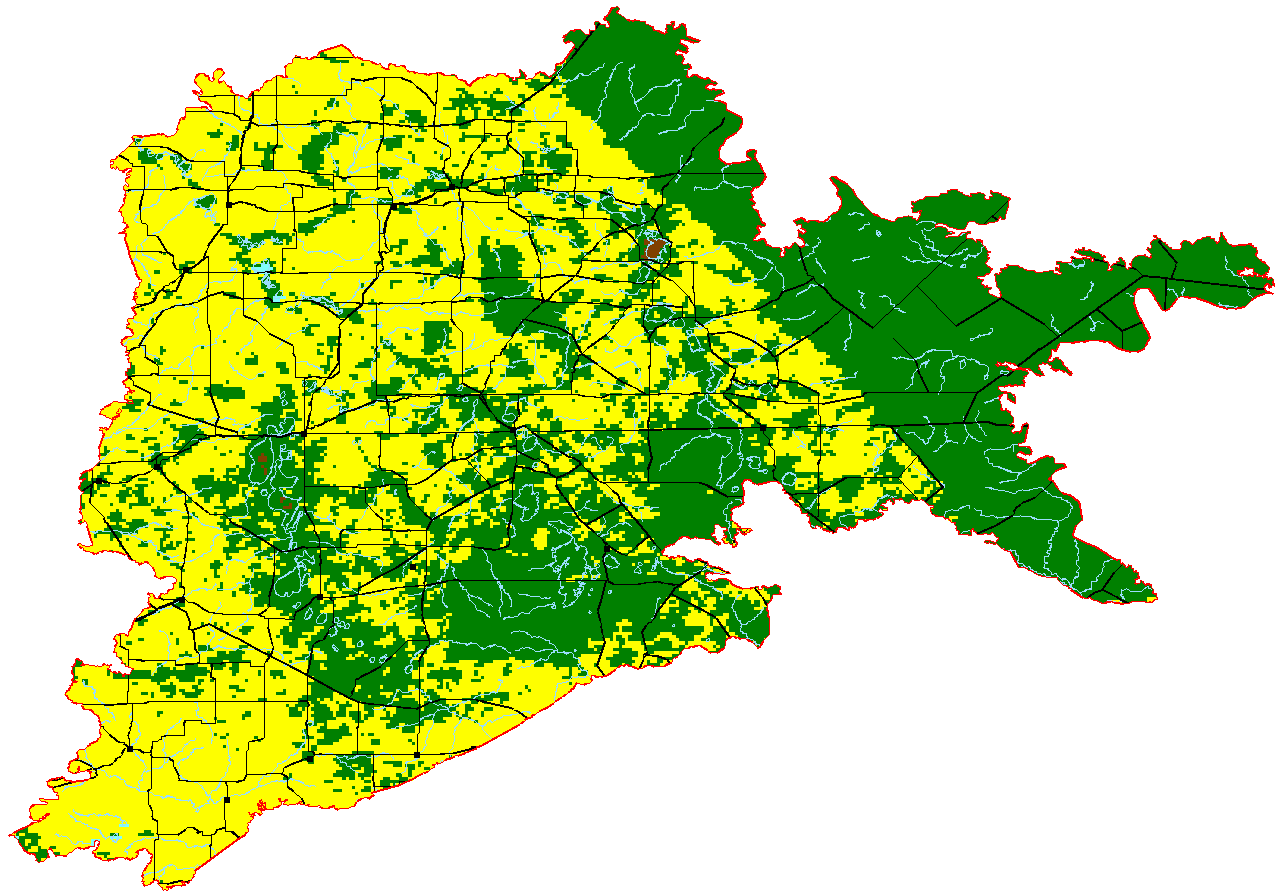
The Western Mallee subregion, with agricultural areas in yellow, and native vegetation in green

Western Mallee is roughly defined as the western half of the Mallee biogeographic region. It has an area of 47,636 square kilometres, which is only lightly populated. The main towns are Hyden, Gnowangerup and Lake Grace; smaller towns and localities include Kulin, Ongerup, Duggan, Newdegate, Lake King and Kondinin.

The subregion contains a number of ecologically important freshwater wetlands, including the Lake Bryde-East Lake Bryde wetlands, a DIWA Wetland of National Significance and habitat for a critically endangered threatened ecological community of shrub lake beds; the Lake Grace system of wetlands, also a DIWA Wetland of National Significance; and the Lake Cronin system.

== Geology ==
Western Mallee is situated on south-eastern parts of the Yilgarn craton. It has a gently undulating landscape, with somewhat more relief than eastern parts of the Mallee region. There are a variety of soils, including clays and silts over kankar; sand; lateritic pavements; and granite outcrops. Gypsum dunes also occur in the area. The subregion has occluded drainage, with a number of lakes, both saline and fresh.

== Climate ==
Western Mallee is semi-arid, with a warm, dry, Mediterranean climate. It has seven to eight dry months, and a winter rainfall typically between 250 and 500 millimetres (10–19 in).

Climatic Table for Hyden, a town in the Western Mallee subregion
	Jan	Feb	Mar	Apr	May	Jun	Jul	Aug	Sep	Oct	Nov	Dec	Year
Mean daily maximum temperature	33.5°C; 92.3°F	32.8 °C; 91.0 °F	29.8 °C; 85.6 °F	25.5 °C; 77.9 °F	20.6 °C; 69.1 °F	17.2 °C; 63.0 °F	16.3 °C; 61.3 °F	17.3 °C; 63.1 °F	20.2 °C; 68.4 °F	24.4 °C; 75.9 °F	28.2 °C; 82.8 °F	31.9 °C; 89.4 °F	24.8 °C; 76.6 °F
Mean daily minimum temperature	15.3 °C; 59.5 °F	15.7 °C; 60.3 °F	14.1 °C; 57.4 °F	11.1 °C; 52.0 °F	7.7 °C; 45.9 °F	5.7 °C; 42.3 °F	4.7 °C; 40.5 °F	4.7 °C; 40.5 °F	5.9 °C; 42.6 °F	8.1 °C; 46.6 °F	11.4 °C; 52.5 °F	13.8 °C; 56.8 °F	9.9 °C; 49.8 °F
Mean total rainfall	19.4 mm 0.76 in	19.9 mm 0.78 in	20.6 mm 0.81 in	24.6 mm 0.97 in	40.2 mm 1.58 in	51.2 mm 2.02 in	47.1 mm 1.85 in	41.2 mm 1.62 in	27.6 mm 1.09 in	20.8 mm 0.82 in	17.7 mm 0.70 in	13.5 mm 0.53 in	334.9 mm 13.19 in
Mean number of rain days	2.2	2.1	2.2	3.4	5.9	8.2	9.0	7.7	5.6	3.9	2.8	2.1	55.1
Source: Bureau of Meteorology

== Vegetation ==
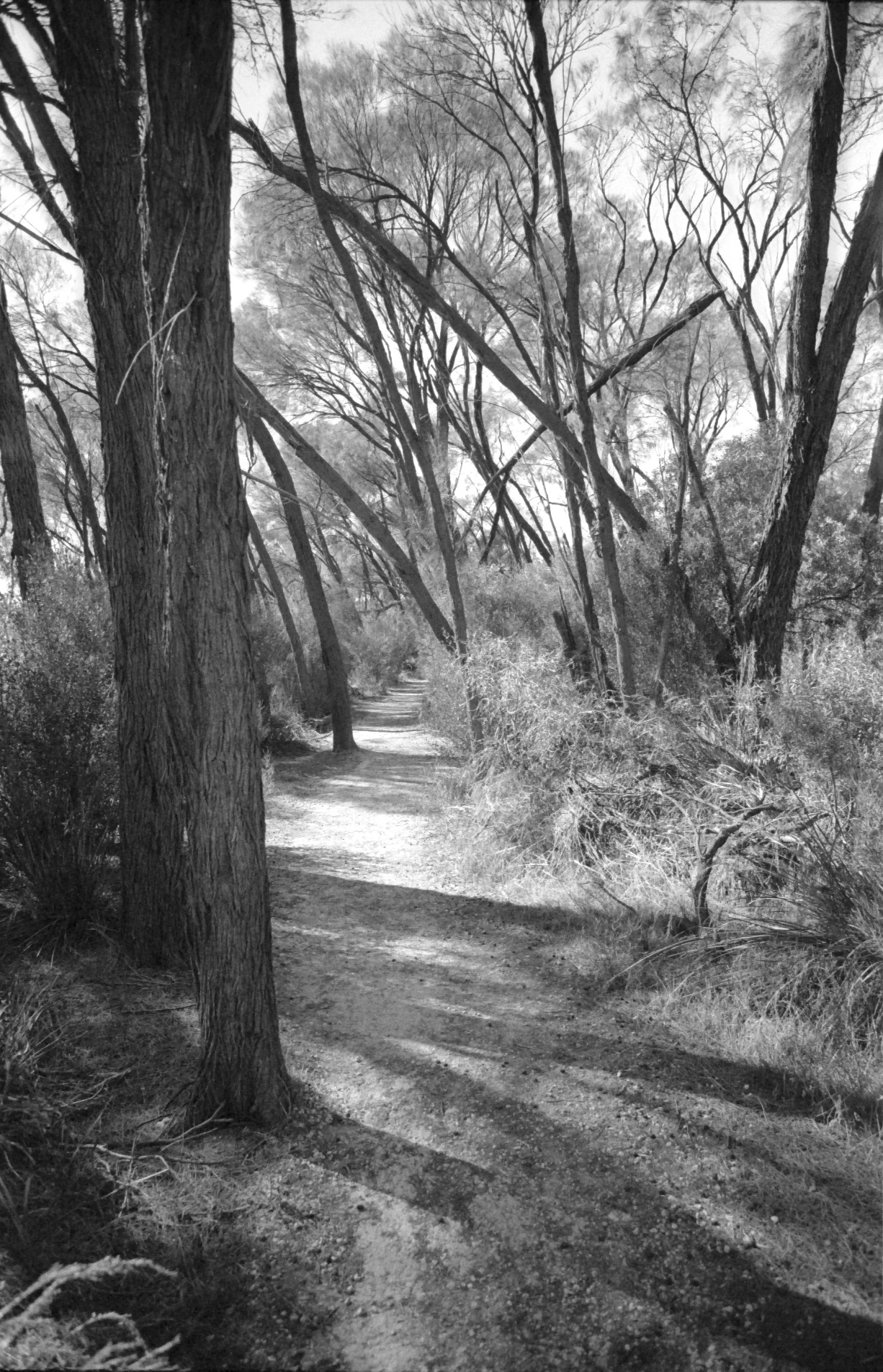
Mallee woodland near Hyden

Only about 30% of the subregion retains its native vegetation. Within this area, most soil types carry mallee communities consisting primarily of Eucalyptus species. Sands and laterites support scrub-heath of Myrtaceae and Proteaceae, and the finer-textured soils support Eucalyptus woodlands; the latter have a particularly high diversity of flora, of which around 25% is rare. Granite outcrops also support a characteristic vegetation.

There are also a number of vegetation communities of lesser extent, including some that are considered endangered or at risk. Most notable is the critically endangered community of Muehlenbeckia horrida subsp. abdita and Tecticornia verrucosa that occurs on the lake beds of the Lake Bryde-East Lake Bryde wetland system. Gypsum dunes support a vulnerable ecological community of herblands and bunch grasslands, and an at-risk community of Eucalyptus aff. incrassata over low scrub; at least 80 plant species are likely to occur only on gypsum dunes, including several threatened species. Some plant communities of the Bremer Range are also considered vulnerable.

== Flora and fauna ==
Information on Western Mallee's flora and fauna is scarce, as the area has not had a thorough biodiversity survey. What information is available has been gathered in the context of conservation assessment:

The subregion contains many endemic plant species in the Eucalyptus, Acacia, Proteaceae such as Grevillea, Hakea and Banksia; and various Asteraceae. It contains numerous rare, endangered and priority flora. It also supports a number of rare or endangered fauna, including some that fall within the critical weight range for predation by foxes. The pig-footed bandicoot (Chaeropus ecaudatus) and crescent nailtail wallaby (Onychogalea lunata) previously occurred in the subregion, but both are now extinct. The rufous hare-wallaby (Lagorchestes hirsutus) is now extinct in the wild, and a further ten species of mammal are extinct in the subregion. The endangered red-tailed phascogale (Phascogale calura) still occurs in the region, as do the vulnerable black-flanked rock-wallaby (Petrogale lateralis) and heath rat (Pseudomys shortridgei), and the western brush wallaby (Macropus irma).

== Land use ==
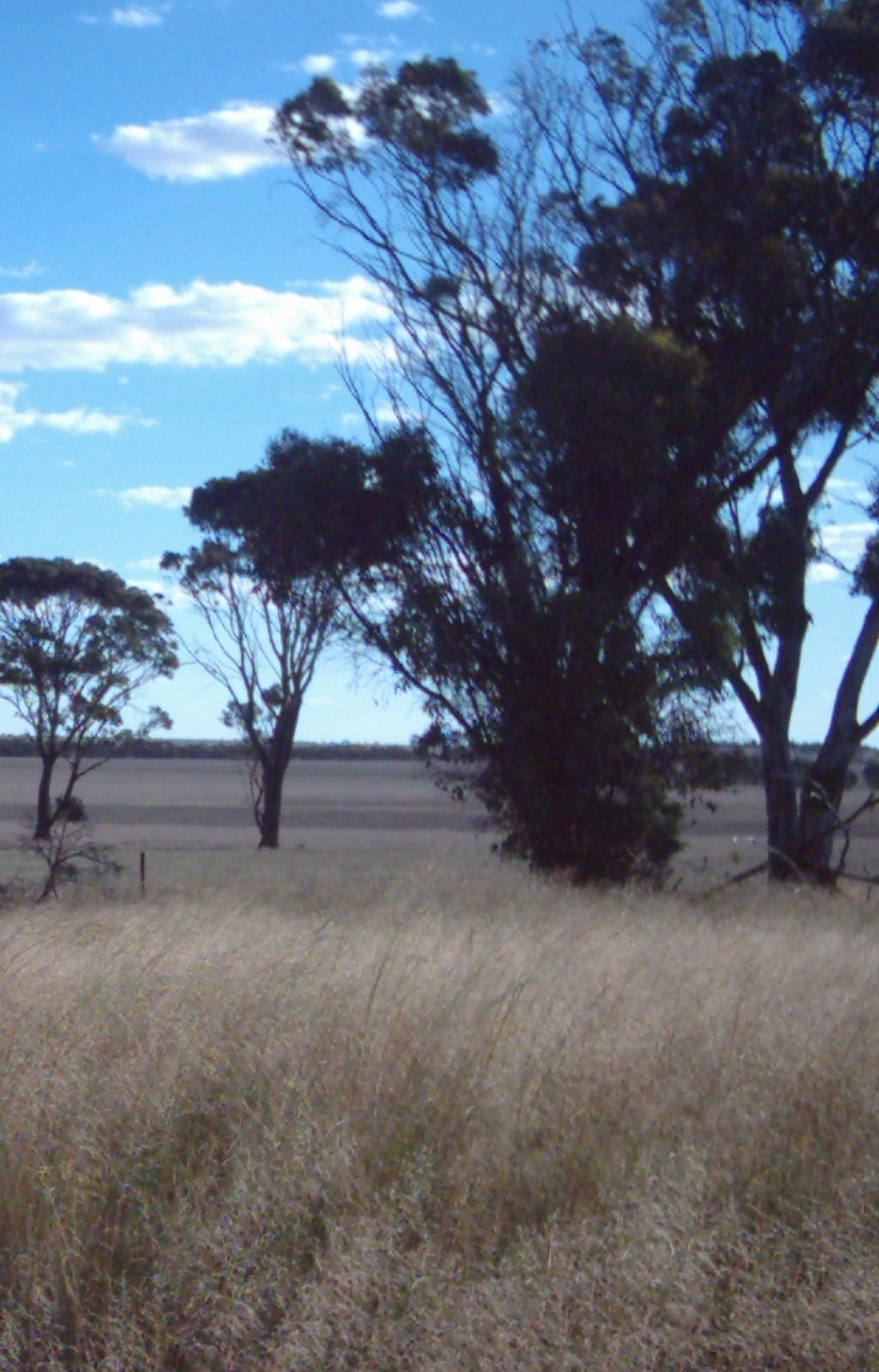
A typical Western Mallee landscape, showing an area predominantly cleared for intensive agriculture, with only a few Eucalyptus trees remaining.

Western Mallee falls within what the Department of Agriculture and Food terms the "Intensive Land-use Zone" (ILZ), the area of Western Australia that has been largely cleared and developed for intensive agriculture such as cropping and livestock production. Within this zone, the vast majority of land has been cleared for agricultural purposes. In Western Mallee's case, only 31% of the area retains its native vegetation.

Around 10% of the subregion is held within nature reserves for conservation purposes, covering about 25% of the remaining vegetation. There is also a small amount of gypsum mining, and a tourist industry centred on Wave Rock near Hyden. The subregion contains populations of Eucalyptus and Melaleuca species that produce commercial quantities of cineole oil, so in future the subregion is likely to support a plantation-based oil mallee industry, at least as a source of breeding material if not also land.

The subregion's nature reserves are poorly managed. Little information is available for management purposes, as the subregion has not had a thorough biodiversity survey, vegetation mapping is available only at 1:250,000 scale, and there are virtually no historical records of fires or other significant events. Other than routine baiting of foxes in some reserves, there is little done to manage threats. The main threat, rising salinity, is completely unmanaged, despite having already caused widespread population declines and extinctions in lowland communities.

The subregion was given a Continental Stress Class of 3 when measured against the criteria, but the authors of that assessment stated that it should more properly be rated at 2 or even 1, because of the poor connectivity of reserves within cleared areas.

== Biogeography ==
Western Mallee was introduced in IBRA Version 6.1. Its region code is MAL2. It is one of two subregions of the Mallee region, the other being Eastern Mallee. The Mallee, Avon Wheatbelt and Geraldton Sandplains regions together comprise Hopper's Transitional Rainfall Zone of Beard's South West Botanical Province. Under the World Wide Fund for Nature's regionalisation of the world's terrestrial surface into "ecoregions", the Western Mallee subregion falls within the Esperance Mallee ecoregion, one of 6 ecoregions comprising the Southwest Australia ecozone.
