= List of threatened ecological communities of Australia =

This list of threatened ecological communities of Australia is derived from the Australian federal government's assessment of submissions regarding ecological communities, assemblages of flora and fauna with identified interactions in particular habitats, with determinations on their conservation status and level of protection under the Environment Protection and Biodiversity Conservation Act 1999. Their status as threatened ecological communities (TEC) is noted as meeting the criteria as critically endangered, endangered, or vulnerable, and where a revision has resulted in delisting or ineligibility.

- Alpine Sphagnum Bogs and Associated Fens, endangered.
- Aquatic Root Mat Community 1 in Caves of the Leeuwin Naturaliste Ridge, endangered.
- Aquatic Root Mat Community 2 in Caves of the Leeuwin Naturaliste Ridge, endangered.
- Aquatic Root Mat Community 3 in Caves of the Leeuwin Naturaliste Ridge, endangered.
- Aquatic Root Mat Community 4 in Caves of the Leeuwin Naturaliste Ridge, endangered.
- Aquatic Root Mat Community in Caves of the Swan Coastal Plain, endangered.
- Arnhem Plateau Sandstone Shrubland Complex, endangered.
- Assemblages of plants and invertebrate animals of tumulus (organic mound) springs of the Swan Coastal Plain, endangered.
- Assemblages of species associated with open-coast salt-wedge estuaries of western and central Victoria ecological community, endangered.
- Banksia Woodlands of the Swan Coastal Plain ecological community, endangered.
- Blue Gum High Forest of the Sydney Basin Bioregion, critically endangered.
- Brigalow (Acacia harpophylla dominant and co-dominant), endangered.
- Broad leaf tea-tree (Melaleuca viridiflora) woodlands in high rainfall coastal north Queensland, endangered.
- Buloke Woodlands of the Riverina and Murray-Darling Depression Bioregions, endangered.
- Castlereagh Scribbly Gum and Agnes Banks Woodlands of the Sydney Basin Bioregion, endangered.
- Central Hunter Valley eucalypt forest and woodland, critically endangered.
- Clay Pans of the Swan Coastal Plain, critically endangered.
- Coastal Swamp Oak (Casuarina glauca) Forest of New South Wales and South East Queensland ecological community, endangered.
- Coastal Upland Swamps in the Sydney Basin Bioregion, endangered.
- Cooks River/Castlereagh Ironbark Forest of the Sydney Basin Bioregion, critically endangered.
- Coolibah - Black Box Woodlands of the Darling Riverine Plains and the Brigalow Belt South Bioregions, endangered.
- Corymbia calophylla - Kingia australis woodlands on heavy soils of the Swan Coastal Plain, endangered.
- Corymbia calophylla - Xanthorrhoea preissii woodlands and shrublands of the Swan Coastal Plain, endangered.
- Cumberland Plain Shale Woodlands and Shale-Gravel Transition Forest, critically endangered.
- Eastern Stirling Range Montane Heath and Thicket, endangered.
- Eastern Suburbs Banksia Scrub of the Sydney Region, endangered.
- Eucalypt Woodlands of the Western Australian Wheatbelt, critically endangered.
- Eucalyptus ovata - Callitris oblonga Forest, vulnerable.
- Eyre Peninsula Blue Gum (Eucalyptus petiolaris) Woodland, endangered.
- Giant Kelp Marine Forests of South East Australia, endangered.
- Gippsland Red Gum (Eucalyptus tereticornis subsp. mediana) Grassy Woodland and Associated Native Grassland, critically endangered.
- Grassy Eucalypt Woodland of the Victorian Volcanic Plain, critically endangered.
- Grey Box (Eucalyptus microcarpa) Grassy Woodlands and Derived Native Grasslands of South eastern Australia, endangered.
- Hunter Valley Weeping Myall (Acacia pendula) Woodland, critically endangered.
- Illawarra and south coast lowland forest and woodland ecological community, critically endangered.
- Iron-grass Natural Temperate Grassland of South Australia, critically endangered.
- Kangaroo Island Narrow leaved Mallee (Eucalyptus cneorifolia) Woodland, critically endangered.
- Littoral Rainforest and Coastal Vine Thickets of Eastern Australia, critically endangered.
- Long lowland rivers of south eastern Queensland and northern New South Wales, currently ineligible.
- Lowland Grassy Woodland in the South East Corner Bioregion, critically endangered.
- Lowland Native Grasslands of Tasmania, critically endangered.
- Lowland Rainforest of Subtropical Australia, critically endangered.
- Mabi Forest (Complex Notophyll Vine Forest 5b), critically endangered.
- Monsoon vine thickets on the coastal sand dunes of Dampier Peninsula, endangered.
- Natural Damp Grassland of the Victorian Coastal Plains, critically endangered.
- Natural Grasslands of the Murray Valley Plains, critically endangered.
- Natural Grasslands of the Queensland Central Highlands and northern Fitzroy Basin, endangered.
- Natural Temperate Grassland of the South Eastern Highlands, critically endangered.
- Natural Temperate Grassland of the Victorian Volcanic Plain, critically endangered.
- Natural grasslands on basalt and fine textured alluvial plains of northern New South Wales and southern Queensland, critically endangered.
- New England Peppermint (Eucalyptus nova anglica) Grassy Woodlands, critically endangered.
- Peppermint Box (Eucalyptus odorata) Grassy Woodland of South Australia, critically endangered.
- Perched Wetlands of the Wheatbelt region with extensive stands of living sheoak and paperbark across the lake floor (Toolibin Lake), endangered.
- Posidonia australis seagrass meadows of the Manning Hawkesbury ecoregion, endangered.
- Proteaceae Dominated Kwongkan Shrublands of the Southeast Coastal Floristic Province of Western Australia, endangered.
- River Murray and associated wetlands, floodplains and groundwater systems, from the junction with the Darling River to the sea, approval disallowed.
- Scott River Ironstone Association, endangered.
- Seasonal Herbaceous Wetlands (Freshwater) of the Temperate Lowland Plains, critically endangered.
- Sedgelands in Holocene dune swales of the southern Swan Coastal Plain, endangered.
- Semi-evergreen vine thickets of the Brigalow Belt (North and South) and Nandewar Bioregions, endangered.
- Shale Sandstone Transition Forest of the Sydney Basin Bioregion, critically endangered.
- Shrublands and Woodlands of the eastern Swan Coastal Plain, endangered.
- Shrublands and Woodlands on Muchea Limestone of the Swan Coastal Plain, endangered.
- Shrublands and Woodlands on Perth to Gingin ironstone (Perth to Gingin ironstone association) of the Swan Coastal Plain, endangered.
- Shrublands on southern Swan Coastal Plain ironstones, endangered.
- Silurian Limestone Pomaderris Shrubland of the South East Corner and Australian Alps Bioregions, endangered.
- Southern Highlands Shale Forest and Woodland in the Sydney Basin Bioregion, critically endangered.
- Subtropical and Temperate Coastal Saltmarsh, vulnerable.
- Swamp Tea-tree (Melaleuca irbyana) Forest of South east Queensland, critically endangered.
- Swamps of the Fleurieu Peninsula, critically endangered.
- Temperate Highland Peat Swamps on Sandstone, endangered.
- The community of native species dependent on natural discharge of groundwater from the Great Artesian Basin, endangered.
- Thrombolite (microbial) community of coastal freshwater lakes of the Swan Coastal Plain (Lake Richmond), endangered.
- Thrombolite (microbialite) Community of a Coastal Brackish Lake (Lake Clifton), critically endangered.
- Turpentine-Ironbark Forest of the Sydney Basin Bioregion, critically endangered.
- Upland Basalt Eucalypt Forests of the Sydney Basin Bioregion, endangered.
- Upland Wetlands of the New England Tablelands (New England Tableland Bioregion) and the Monaro Plateau (South Eastern Highlands Bioregion), endangered.
- Warkworth Sands Woodland of the Hunter Valley, critically endangered.
- Weeping Myall Woodlands, endangered.
- Western Sydney Dry Rainforest and Moist Woodland on Shale, critically endangered.
- Wetlands and inner floodplains of the Macquarie Marshes, approval disallowed.
- White Box-Yellow Box-Blakely's Red Gum Grassy Woodland and Derived Native Grassland, critically endangered.
