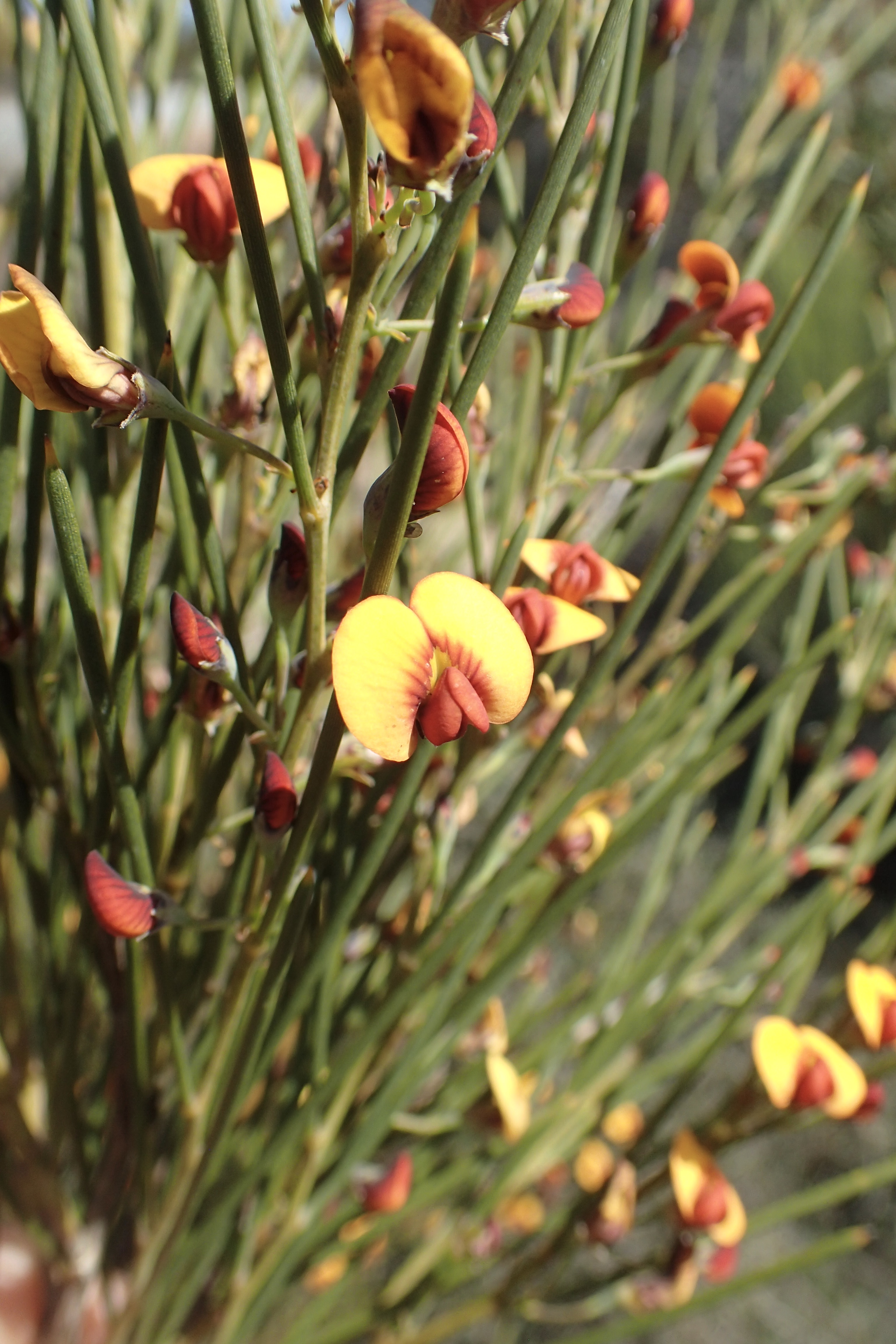
- Near Newdegate

Conservation status
- Priority Two — Poorly Known Taxa (DEC)

Scientific classification
- Kingdom: Plantae
- Clade: Tracheophytes
- Clade: Angiosperms
- Clade: Eudicots
- Clade: Rosids
- Order: Fabales
- Family: Fabaceae
- Subfamily: Faboideae
- Genus: Daviesia
- Species: D. lineata

Binomial name
- Daviesia lineata Crisp

= Daviesia lineata =

Species of flowering plant

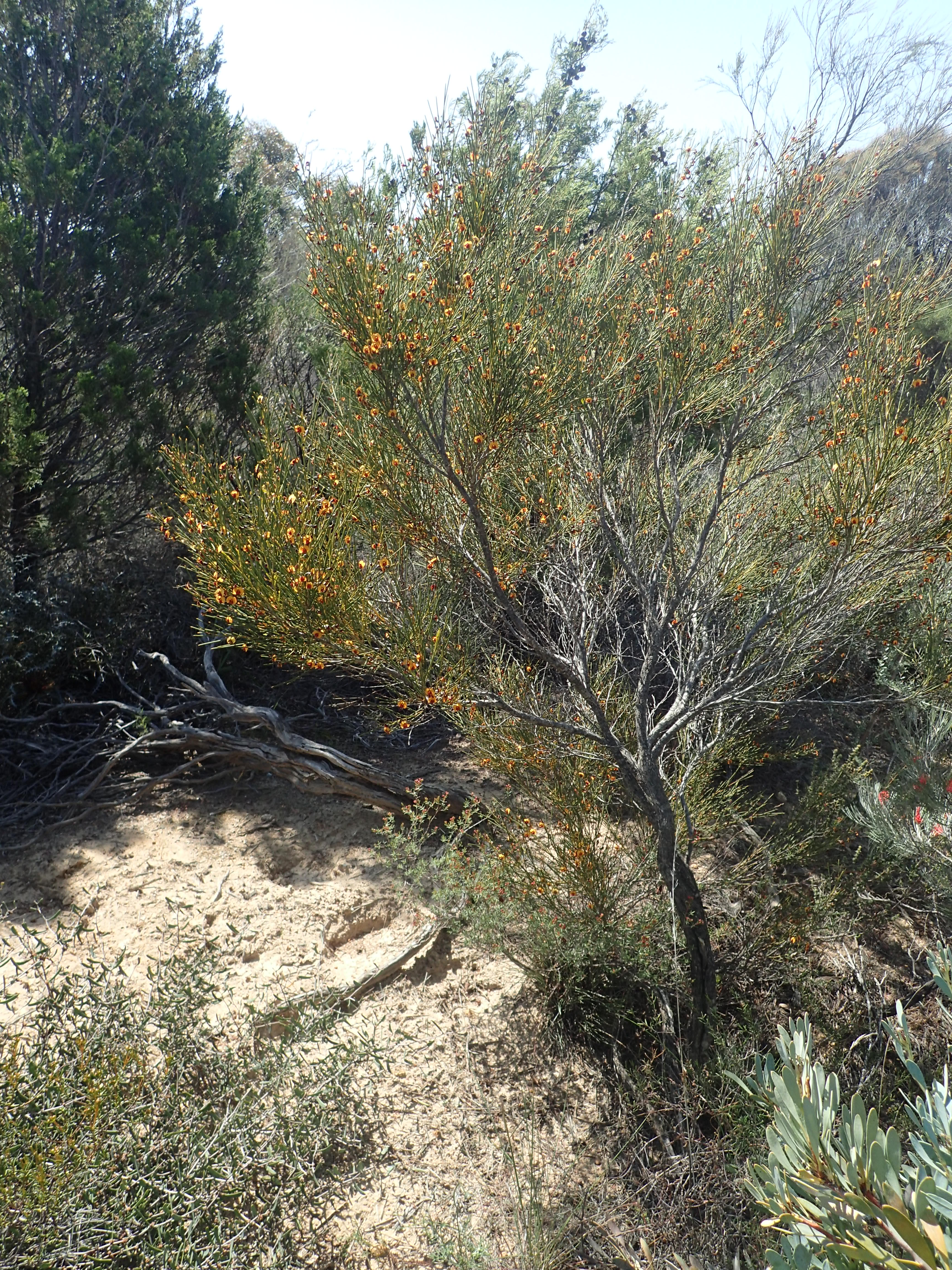
Habit

Daviesia lineata is a species of flowering plant in the family Fabaceae and is endemic to the south-west of Western Australia. It is an erect, bushy shrub with scattered needle-shaped, sharply-pointed phyllodes and yellow and reddish flowers.

== Description ==
Daviesia lineata is an erect, bushy shrub that typically grows to a height of up to 2.5 m (8 ft 2 in). Its phyllodes are scattered, needle-shaped, sharply-pointed, 30–110 mm (1.2–4.3 in) long, 0.75–1.0 mm (0.030–0.039 in) wide and finely striated. The flowers are arranged in groups of one or two in leaf axils on a peduncle 1.5–4.0 mm (0.059–0.157 in) long, the rachis up to 1 mm (0.039 in) long, each flower on a pedicel 4–8 mm (0.16–0.31 in) long. The sepals are 4.5–6.0 mm (0.18–0.24 in) long and joined at the base, the upper two lobes joined for most of their length and the lower three triangular and about 1 mm (0.039 in) long. The standard petal is broadly egg-shaped, 8–10 mm (0.31–0.39 in) long and yellow with a dark red centre, the wings 7.0–7.5 mm (0.28–0.30 in) long and orange-red, and the keel about 6.5 mm (0.26 in) long and red. Flowering occurs in September and October and the fruit is a triangular pod 17–20 mm (0.67–0.79 in) long with a sharply-pointed beak.

== Taxonomy and naming ==
Daviesia lineata was first formally described in 1995 by Michael Crisp in Australian Systematic Botany from specimens collected near Newdegate on the road to Lake King in 1984. The specific epithet (lineata) means "marked with straight lines", referring to the phyllodes.

== Distribution and habitat ==
This daviesia grows in kwongan in areas largely cleared for agriculture in the Newdegate – Lake King area in the Mallee biogeographic region of south-western Western Australia.

== Conservation status ==
Daviesia lineata is listed as "Priority Two" by the Western Australian Government Department of Biodiversity, Conservation and Attractions, meaning that it is poorly known and from only one or a few locations.
