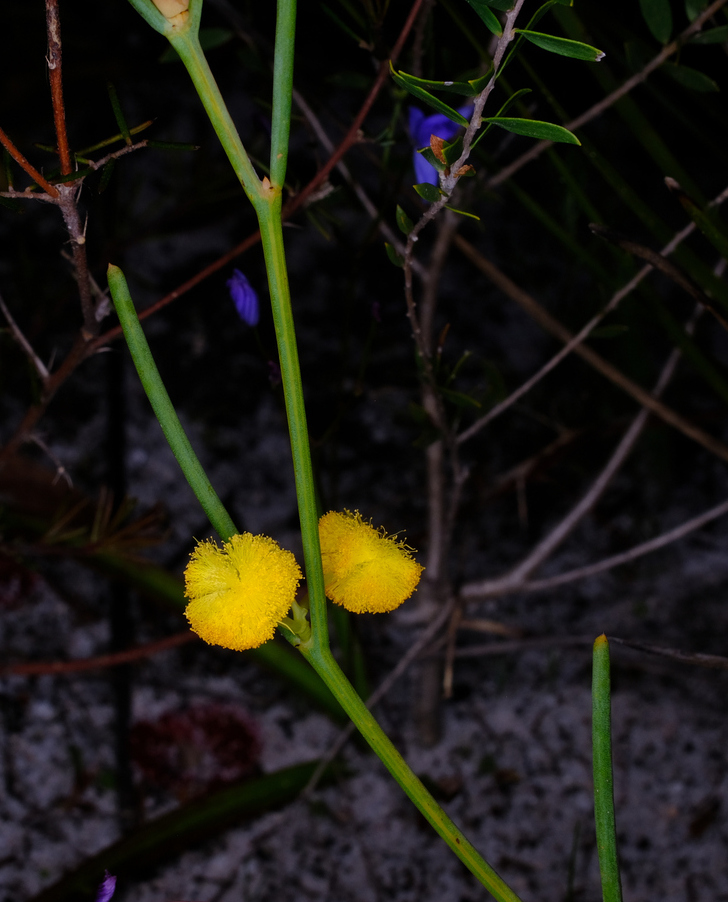
- Near Tenterden

Scientific classification
- Kingdom: Plantae
- Clade: Embryophytes
- Clade: Tracheophytes
- Clade: Spermatophytes
- Clade: Angiosperms
- Clade: Eudicots
- Clade: Rosids
- Order: Fabales
- Family: Fabaceae
- Subfamily: Caesalpinioideae
- Clade: Mimosoid clade
- Genus: Acacia
- Species: A. squamata

Binomial name
- Acacia squamata Lindl.
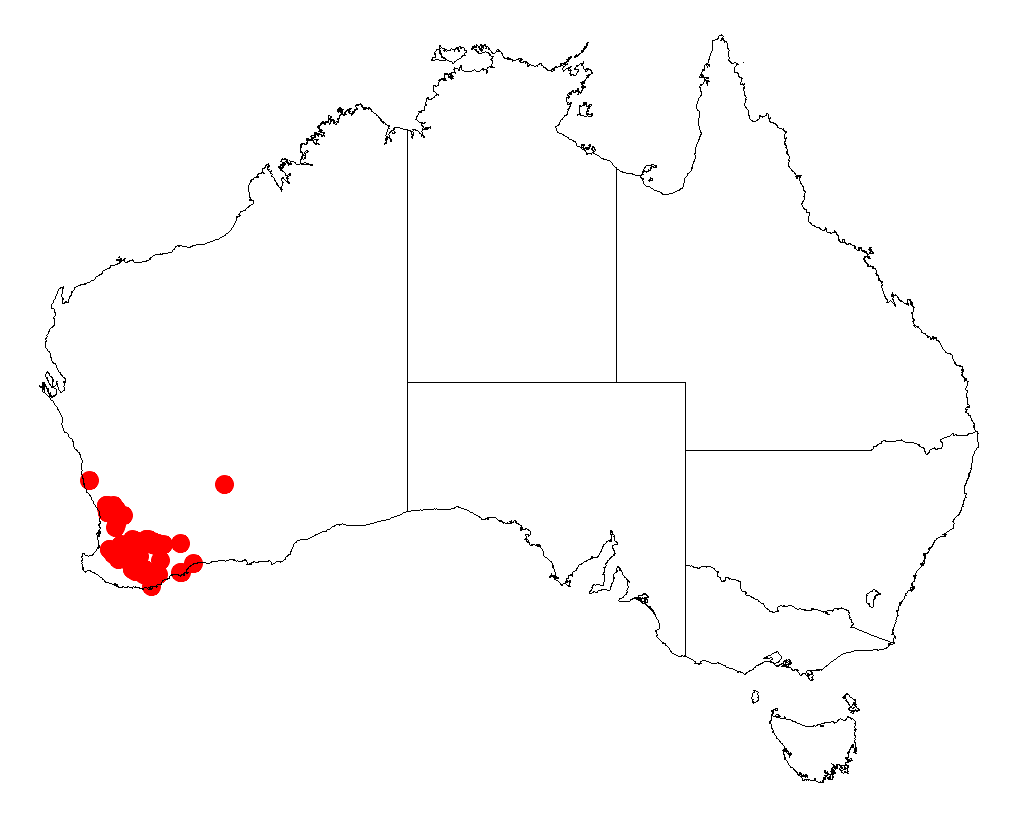
- Occurrence data from AVH

= Acacia squamata =

Species of legume

Acacia squamata is a shrub of the genus Acacia and the subgenus Phyllodineae that is endemic to south western Australia.

== Description ==
The erect and sometimes trailing shrub typically grows to a height of 0.1 to 0.6 metres (0.3 to 2.0 ft). It is usually has maulitple glabrous stems and is occasionally rhizomatous. The flexible, green to grey green cylindrical stems have barely visible nerves. Like most species of Acacia it has phyllodes rather than true leaves. The distant grey-green phyllodes resemble the stems and are ascending to erect with a length of 2 to 7 cm (0.79 to 2.76 in) and a width of 1 to 2 mm (0.039 to 0.079 in) and sometimes have a hooked appearance. It blooms from July to September and produces yellow flowers. The simple inflorescences occur in pairs of groups of four short racemes. The spherical flower-heads contain 6 to 11 golden coloured flowers. Following flowering crustaceous seed pods form that have a linear to narrowly oblong shape with a length of up to 8 cm (3.1 in) and a width of 4 to 5 mm (0.16 to 0.20 in) with thickened margins. The dull to shiny brown seeds inside are arranged longitudinally and have an oblong shape with a length of about 4 mm (0.16 in).

== Taxonomy ==
The type specimen was collected by James Drummond in 1839.

== Description ==
It is native to an area in the Wheatbelt, Great Southern and South West regions of Western Australia where it mostly grows in gravelly lateritic soils. The bulk of the population is found from around Bindoon in the north west down to around Mount Barker extending to around Fitzgerald River National Park in the south east and up to around Newdegate in the north east growing in a variety of habitats in sandy to loamy laterite based soils as a part of Eucalyptus woodland, heath or scrubland communities.

== See also ==
- List of Acacia species
