= TPD52L2 =

Protein-coding gene in the species Homo sapiens

Identifiers
- Aliases: TPD52L2, D54, TPD54, tumor protein D52 like 2, TPD52 like 2
- External IDs: OMIM: 603747; MGI: 1913564; HomoloGene: 2469; GeneCards: TPD52L2; OMA:TPD52L2 - orthologs

Gene location (Human)
Chr.	Chromosome 20 (human)
Band	20q13.33	Start	63,865,228 bp
Band	20q13.33	End	63,891,545 bp

Gene location (Mouse)
Chr.	Chromosome 2 (mouse)
Band	2|2 H4	Start	181,138,935 bp
Band	2|2 H4	End	181,159,759 bp
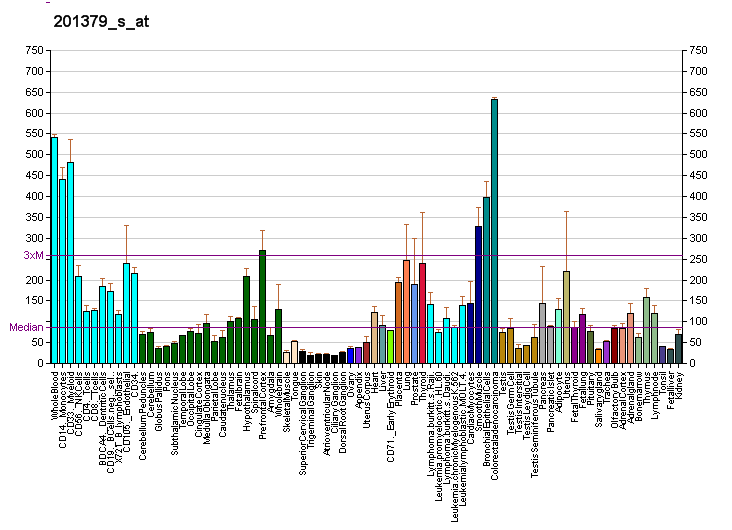
RNA expression pattern
Bgee	Human / Mouse (ortholog); Top expressed in: right coronary artery; ascending aorta; popliteal artery; tibial arteries; stromal cell of endometrium; Descending thoracic aorta; gastric mucosa; left coronary artery; smooth muscle tissue; ectocervix / Top expressed in: saccule; otic placode; morula; genital tubercle; secondary oocyte; zygote; tail of embryo; blastocyst; condyle; otic vesicle; More reference expression data
BioGPS	More reference expression data
Gene ontology
Molecular function	protein binding; protein homodimerization activity; protein heterodimerization activity; RNA binding; catalytic activity
Cellular component	cytoplasm; perinuclear region of cytoplasm
Biological process	regulation of cell population proliferation
Sources:Amigo / QuickGO
Orthologs
Species	Human	Mouse
Entrez	7165	66314
Ensembl	ENSG00000101150	ENSMUSG00000000827
UniProt	O43399; Q6FGS1	Q9CYZ2
RefSeq (mRNA)	NM_001243891; NM_001243892; NM_001243894; NM_001243895; NM_003288 NM_199359; NM_199360; NM_199361; NM_199362; NM_199363	NM_001291197; NM_001291200; NM_001291201; NM_001291202; NM_001291203 NM_001291204; NM_025482; NM_001373959; NM_001373960; NM_001373961
RefSeq (protein)	NP_001230820; NP_001230821; NP_001230823; NP_001230824; NP_003279 NP_955391; NP_955392; NP_955393; NP_955394; NP_955395; NP_003279.2	NP_001278126; NP_001278129; NP_001278130; NP_001278131; NP_001278132 NP_001278133; NP_079758; NP_001360888; NP_001360889; NP_001360890; NP_001393282; NP_001393283; NP_001393284; NP_001393285; NP_001393286; NP_001393287; NP_001393288; NP_001393289; NP_001393290; NP_001393291; NP_001393292
Location (UCSC)	Chr 20: 63.87 – 63.89 Mb	Chr 2: 181.14 – 181.16 Mb
PubMed search
- Wikidata
View/Edit Human	View/Edit Mouse

Tumor protein D54 is a protein that in humans is encoded by the TPD52L2 gene.

== Interactions ==
TPD52L2 has been shown to interact with TPD52L1 and TPD52.

== Cellular function ==
TPD52L2 has a role in membrane traffic. TPD52L2 is found on small transport vesicles, termed intracellular nanovesicles, that transfer proteins between different cellular compartments. When TPD52L2 is depleted from HeLa cells, the following trafficking pathways are impaired: anterograde traffic, recycling of cargo and Golgi integrity. Proteomic analysis indicates that TPD52L2 is one of the most abundant proteins expressed in HeLa cells.
