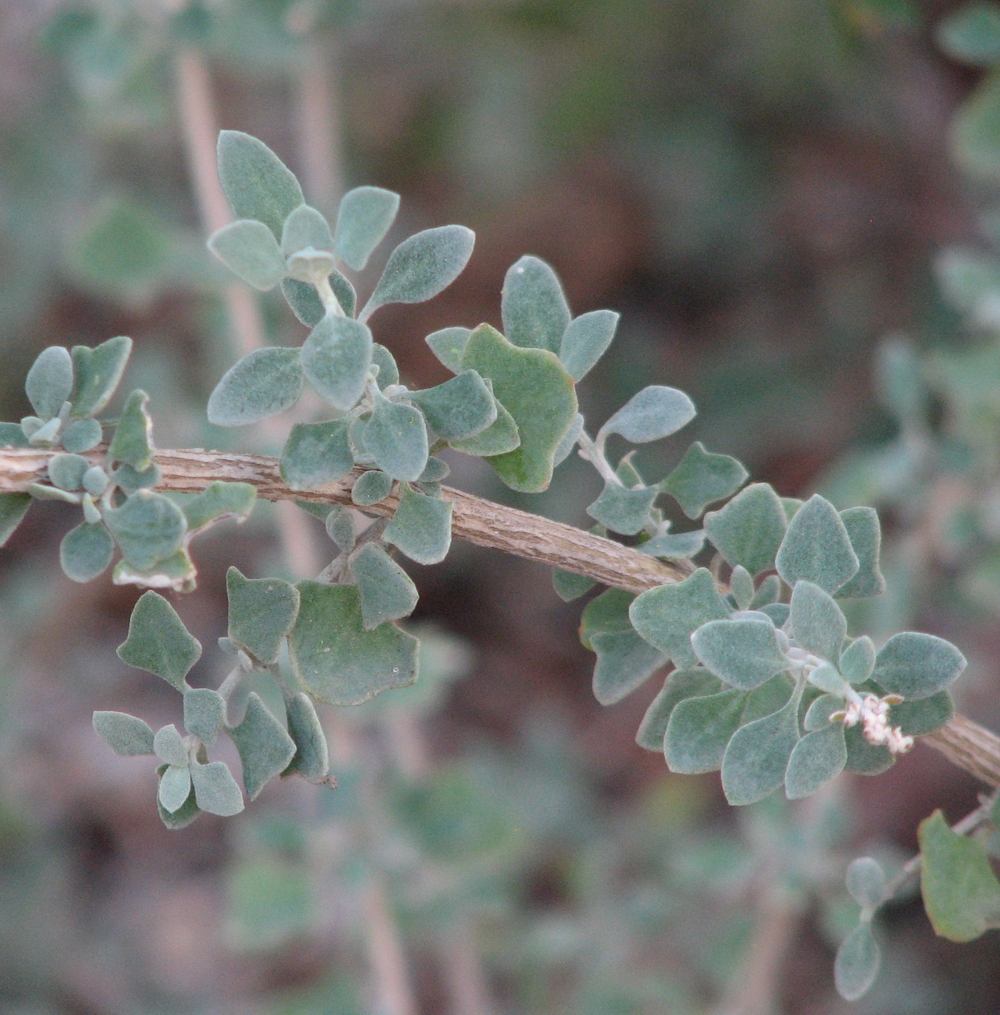

Scientific classification
- Kingdom: Plantae
- Clade: Embryophytes
- Clade: Tracheophytes
- Clade: Angiosperms
- Clade: Eudicots
- Order: Caryophyllales
- Family: Amaranthaceae
- Genus: Atriplex
- Species: A. amnicola

Binomial name
- Atriplex amnicola Paul G.Wilson

= Atriplex amnicola =

River saltbush

Species of flowering plant

Atriplex amnicola, commonly known as river saltbush or swamp saltbush, is a species of shrub in the family Amaranthaceae. Endemic to Western Australia, it is native to the floodplains of the Murchison and Gascoyne Rivers.

== Description ==
River saltbush is a multi-branched shrub whose form ranges from prostrate to erect. In ideal conditions it may be up to four metres wide, and the erect form may be up to 2.5 metres high. The branches of river saltbush spread along the ground, and may layer and take root, especially in the prostrate form. The leaves are bluish-green and covered in fine silvery hairs. There is great variation in leaf size and shape, but they are often spear-shaped, and usually between one and three centimetres long. Male and female flowers are borne on separate plants. Male flowers are a purplish-green colour, and help in clusters at the ends of branches; female flowers usually cluster in the axils between leaves and stems. This is a predominantly dioecious species, with male and female flowers produced on separate individuals. The fruit is a woody case about five millimetres square, each containing a single seed.

River saltbush is very highly salt tolerant, and is used in Australia in the rehabilitation of saline areas. When grown in saline soil, it has the best long-term survival and growth of any saltbush. It is also fairly drought tolerant, and tolerates waterlogging well once mature. It is highly favoured by sheep, and recovers well from grazing. Studies have shown that the meat of sheep grazed on river saltbush is high in Vitamin E and has high "consumer appeal". Disadvantages include a low volunteering rate, and difficulties establishing by direct seeding.

== See also ==
- Salinity in Australia
