= TPD52L1 =

Protein-coding gene in the species Homo sapiens

Identifiers
- Aliases: TPD52L1, D53, hD53, tumor protein D52-like 1, tumor protein D52 like 1, TPD52 like 1, TPD53
- External IDs: OMIM: 604069; MGI: 1298386; HomoloGene: 2468; GeneCards: TPD52L1; OMA:TPD52L1 - orthologs

Gene location (Human)
Chr.	Chromosome 6 (human)
Band	6q22.31	Start	125,119,049 bp
Band	6q22.31	End	125,264,407 bp

Gene location (Mouse)
Chr.	Chromosome 10 (mouse)
Band	10|10 A4	Start	31,208,372 bp
Band	10|10 A4	End	31,321,954 bp
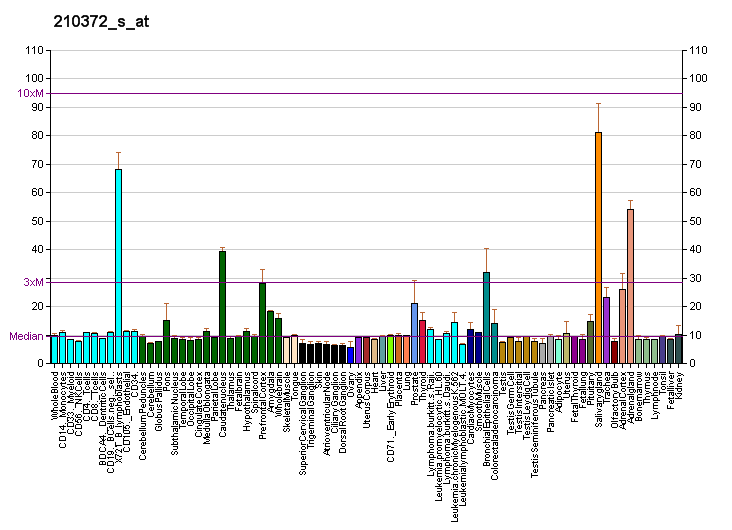

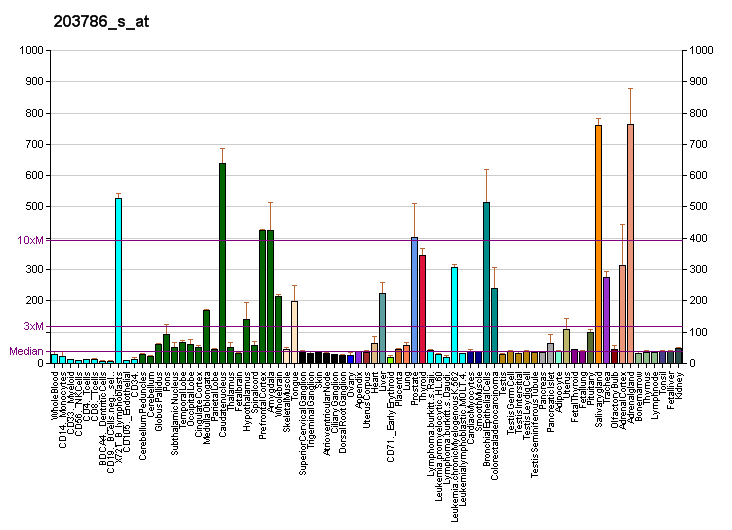
RNA expression pattern
Bgee	Human / Mouse (ortholog); Top expressed in: parotid gland; right adrenal cortex; germinal epithelium; left adrenal gland; left adrenal cortex; putamen; Epithelium of choroid plexus; pancreatic ductal cell; minor salivary glands; external globus pallidus / Top expressed in: seminal vesicula; parotid gland; submandibular gland; Epithelium of choroid plexus; extraocular muscle; dorsal striatum; fourth ventricle; choroid plexus of fourth ventricle; lateral geniculate nucleus; lateral septal nucleus; More reference expression data
BioGPS	More reference expression data
Gene ontology
Molecular function	protein binding; protein homodimerization activity; identical protein binding; protein heterodimerization activity
Cellular component	cytoplasm; perinuclear region of cytoplasm
Biological process	positive regulation of apoptotic signaling pathway; positive regulation of JNK cascade; G2/M transition of mitotic cell cycle; positive regulation of MAP kinase activity
Sources:Amigo / QuickGO
Orthologs
Species	Human	Mouse
Entrez	7164	21987
Ensembl	ENSG00000111907	ENSMUSG00000000296
UniProt	Q16890	O54818
RefSeq (mRNA)	NM_001003395; NM_001003396; NM_001003397; NM_001292026; NM_001300994 NM_003287; NM_001318903; NM_001318907	NM_009413; NM_001359364; NM_001359365; NM_001359366
RefSeq (protein)	NP_001003395; NP_001003396; NP_001003397; NP_001278955; NP_001287923 NP_001305832; NP_001305836; NP_003278	NP_033439; NP_001346293; NP_001346294; NP_001346295
Location (UCSC)	Chr 6: 125.12 – 125.26 Mb	Chr 10: 31.21 – 31.32 Mb
PubMed search
- Wikidata
View/Edit Human	View/Edit Mouse

Tumor protein D52 is a protein that in humans is encoded by the TPD52L1 gene.

== Function ==
This gene encodes a member of the tumor protein D52 (TPD52) family. The encoded protein contains a coiled-coil domain and may form homo- or hetero-dimer with TPD52 family members. The protein is reported to be involved in cell proliferation and calcium signaling. It also interacts with the mitogen-activated protein kinase kinase kinase 5 (MAP3K5/ASK1) and positively regulates MAP3K5-induced apoptosis. Multiple alternatively spliced transcript variants have been observed, but the full-length nature of some variants has not yet been determined.

== Interactions ==
TPD52L1 has been shown to interact with TPD52L2 and TPD52.
