= Dryland salinity =

Natural process for soil

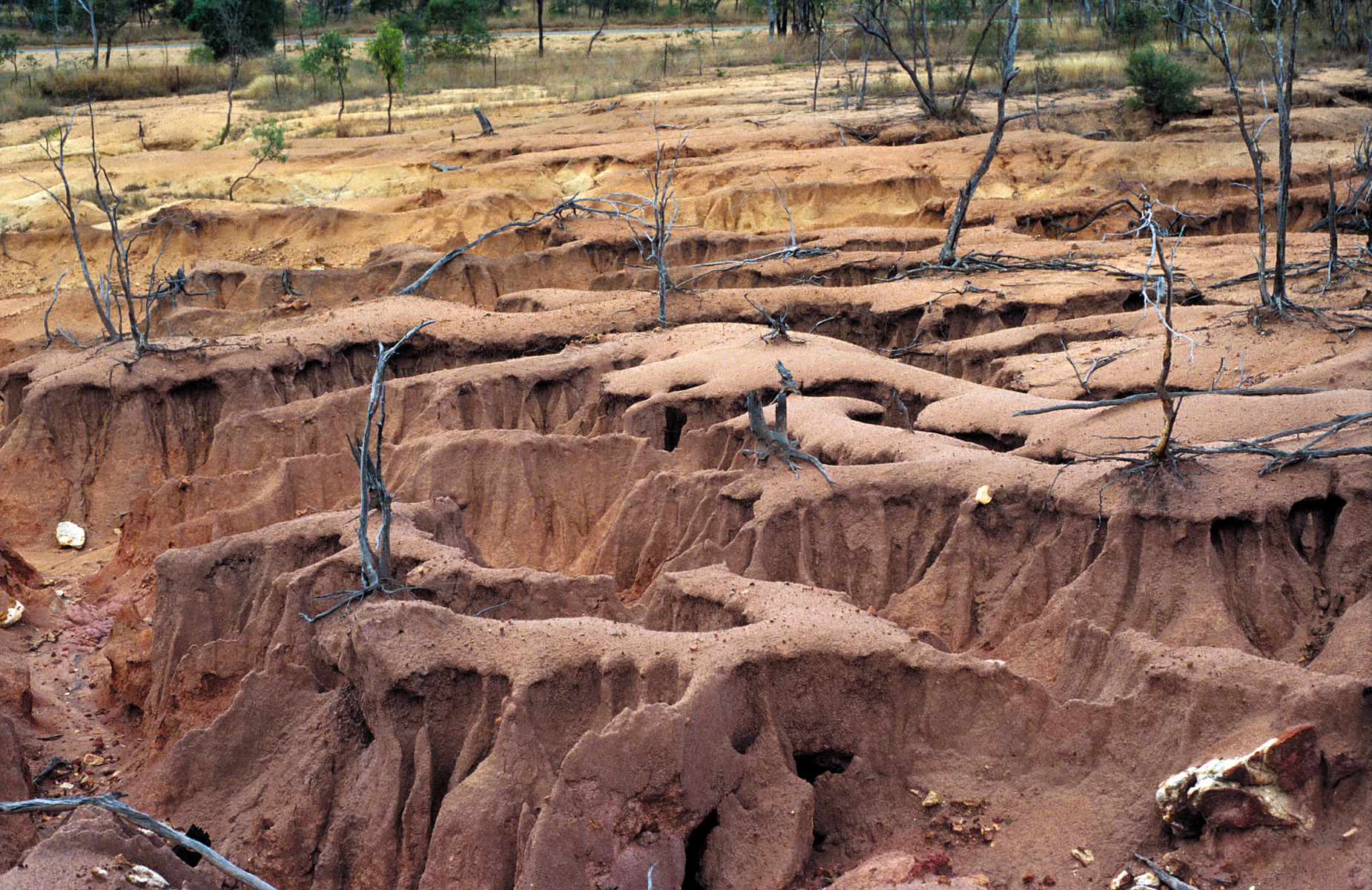
Effects of dryland salinity as observed in northern Queensland, Australia, in 2007.

Dryland salinity is the increase in an environment, watercourse or soil's concentration of salt beyond its normal levels. Dryland salinity is a natural process, but one that can be greatly exacerbated by human activity.

== Definition ==
Salinity refers to the movement and concentration of salt in the landscape and its associated detriment to land and water resources; dryland salinity refers to salinity in unirrigated landscapes. Salinity processes extend from local to regional scales and are driven by imbalances in the water budget that result, primarily, from agriculturally driven landscape change. There are two types of salinity: Primary salinity (natural salinity) and secondary salinity (induced salinity).

Primary salinity naturally occurs in arid and saline environments such as salt lakes, marshes, pans and salt flats. Natural accumulation of salt in soils is an outcome from previous cycles of drainage, desiccation and sea winds. High levels of salt are often found in dry soils, more so than wet soils as it is diluted and washed through the soil profile. (Barry and Holwell et al., 2012).

Secondary salinity is a direct result of human interaction with the land, during development, agriculture and irrigation. Certain land practices have led to changes in the natural structure of the biosphere resulting in excess salting of the land, waterways and soils; thus having detrimental effects on biodiversity and the lands' productivity.

== Causes ==
Dryland salinity is broadly the result of three processes: groundwater recharge, groundwater movement and groundwater discharge. (Environment.nsw.gov.au, 2013)

Groundwater recharge occurs naturally, being a key process in the development of salinity, however land clearing accelerates this development as the once present deep-rooted plants do not use excess runoff, and it now seeps past the root zone to enter the groundwater system. (Environment.nsw.gov.au, 2013) Evapotranspiration is reduced, as vegetation is lost, resulting in an imbalance in groundwater recharge and discharge, causing the water table to rise. Capillary action brings salt to the surface initiating surface salt accumulation. (Barry and Holwell et al., 2012)

Prevention and alleviation of dry land salinity is a simplistic concept in theory however complex in application. Ceasing the removal of deeply rooted vegetation in order to moderate unbalanced groundwater recharge and the replanting of deeply rooted vegetation such as Eucalyptus and salt tolerant species in regions where salinity is present, will start to alleviate the salt and ground water discharge problems. (Barry and Holwell et al., 2012) However, establishing plants in salt laden areas is extremely difficult.

Dryland salinity is a sign that the water balance of the nearby area of land or catchment has been altered. Clearing as little as 25% of a catchment can cause salinity to occur. In addition to adding extra recharge, salinity may also be caused if the aquifers discharge capacity has been exceeded. In many Australian landscapes, aquifer capacity may be several orders of magnitude below that of the altered recharge. Restoring the balance requires either the introduction of natural vegetation (e.g. mallee eucalyptus or perennial grasses), which intercepts and transpires most of the incoming rainfall; or by adapting agriculture to the increased area of shallow, saline groundwater.

=== Salinity and water cycle ===
Factors such as climate, features of landscape, soils, drainage, aspect and the effects of human activities all impact on the severity and occurrence of dryland salinity. Dryland salinity effects human and natural resources, such as native vegetation and crops, animals, infrastructure, agricultural inputs, biodiversity, aquatic ecosystems and water supply quality in the environment. Understanding dryland salinity requires a look at the water cycle. Water enters the soil from precipitation – this is called infiltration; water may remain indefinitely within the spaces or pores between soil particles as soil moisture. Soil moisture may be lost to the surface or atmosphere directly, or through plant uptake – this is called evapotranspiration. Soil moisture may also continue to move downward to join the groundwater—this is called groundwater recharge. Recharge is most likely to occur when the amount of water that is available to the soil exceeds the soil’s capacity to store it (field capacity). Recharge may also occur by saturated flow when water bypasses the soil matrix as it moves to depth in macropores (e.g. root holes, fractures).

Excessive recharge may raise the water table locally, or at a landscape scale. When brackish to saline groundwater intersects the ground surface and discharges, this is termed saline discharge. Areas of discharge are called saline seeps (when groundwater intersects the soil surface) or saline scalds (where water is lost by evaporation only). Groundwater discharge manifests in such problems as: reduced agricultural production, degradation of natural environment, reduced surface water quality, damage to infrastructure including roads, as well as soil erosion and denudation of land.

=== Land use ===
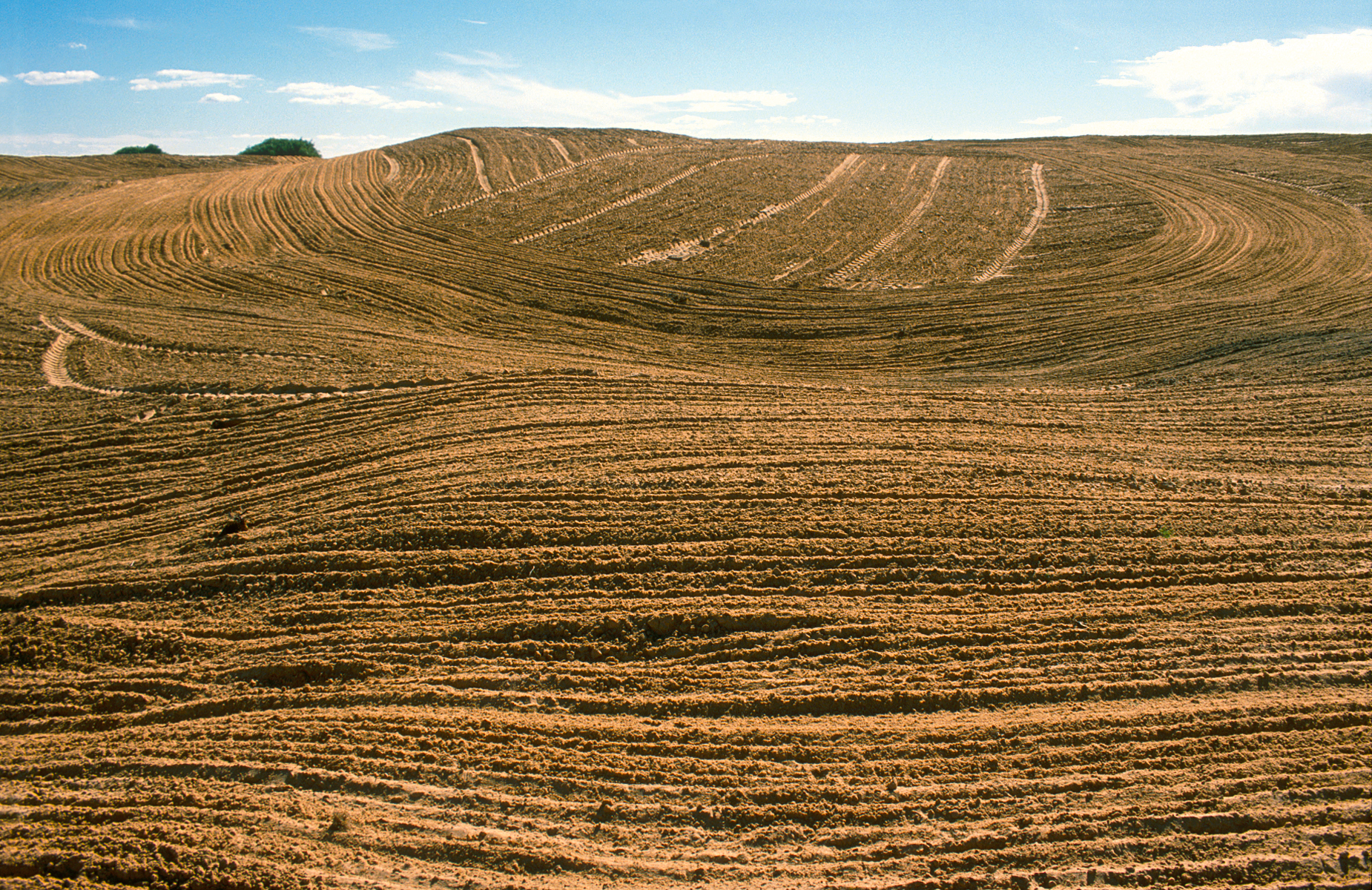
Area of South Australia cleared of native Mallee bushland in 1992

Vegetation plays an important role in controlling an environment's salinity. In arid environments like in Australia, native vegetation has evolved to survive the arid conditions. These native trees, shrubs and grasses create a 'soil sponge' made of roots and healthy soil that can extend up to 6 metres (20 ft) deep. After a prolonged period of rain, the water table is prevented from rising too far to the surface by the native vegetation's deep roots as they draw water from lower soil layers.

Additionally, the 'soil sponge' means less water will percolate and recharge the groundwater reservoirs. This keeps the water table stable and low. This is in contrast to most introduced plants who are not suited to the arid environments. Their shorter roots allows the water table rise further up, which allows for the salt in the groundwater to also move further to the surface. Additionally, shorter roots reduce the soil sponge's thickness to 1 metre (3.3 ft) or less, greatly reducing its capacity to hold water which allows the groundwater to further rise.

This is especially prevalent in land used for agriculture and livestock where native vegetation has been removed. Crops such as wheat have small and shallow root systems. Overgrazing by livestock also reduces the ability of plants to use available water. Other ways land use can lead to dryland salinity include late sowing as it leaves land empty, allowing for soil to accumulate due to little transpiration. This is similar to having periods of long fallows.

== Factors ==
=== Climate ===
Natural groundwater reserves are replenished primarily from rainfall. In climates where rain is able to replenish groundwater reserves at a faster rate than evaporation can drain them, salts are prevented from accumulating in the soil and are flushed by either surface or groundwater flows into the ocean. In climates where the rate of evaporation exceeds the ability of rainfall to replenish groundwater reserves, such as arid environments, the concentration of salts is allowed to accumulate. This occurs mainly in the warmer months.

== Management ==
=== Role of soils ===
Dryland salinity management often focuses on vegetation, yet it is the collective role of soils and vegetation that has an effect on the root cause of the problem, recharge. Soil health cannot be ignored as a valuable and extensive activity for the management of dryland salinity – the multiple benefits of improving soil health are clear and can be motivated by the potential for local and regional economic and social gains.

Soil is considered in two contexts when it comes to dryland salinity: Recharge and discharge.

Soils in groundwater recharge areas

Soils absorb and store water according to their water holding or field capacity and how dry they are to start with. In much of Victoria, under typical rainfall and natural vegetation cover, soils take on water during wet winters and dry out over summers as plants consume the water (Young & Young, 2001). The drier the soil when leading into winter, the more water can be stored that might otherwise leak to groundwater.

To reduce recharge to levels that existed in pre-clearing conditions is generally infeasible in most agricultural landscapes. This is because there are too few profitable perennials that can replace crops or that can be adopted at the scale required. In most recharge areas that are at risk of future salinity, the goal is to minimise recharge. This can be done by planting wide-spaced trees (alley farming), areas of perennials on suitable soils, and by preventing soils from being left without a significant leaf area in winter and spring. In recharge areas remote from saline areas there is often little incentive for farmers to adopt low profit, low recharge systems. In addition, recharge is the source of fresh groundwater, and a trade off between consumptive use and salinity should be acknowledged.

Soils in groundwater discharge areas

The manifestation of dryland salinity is largely a problem of groundwater – however the accumulation of salt within the soil and at the surface due to proximity to or saturation by saline groundwater causes changes to the soil’s chemistry, structure and stability, and the plant life that it supports.

Managing soils for dryland salinity in catchments

In discharge areas, salinity can be managed by establishing salt-tolerant plants or by engineering systems. Engineering systems include deep open drains, pumps, siphons and various forms of surface water management. Engineering system involve the obvious discharge of salt and water. While saline areas also discharge salt and water, the abundance and timing will be changed. In most Australian states, farmers would be advised to seek advice before using engineering systems.

Establishing salt-tolerant plants can improve salt discharge rates and improve soil health. Improvements undertaken at a catchment scale bring many benefits, not the least of which is providing for increased agricultural and associated regional productivity – using water for production that otherwise would contribute to an environmental problem.

== See also ==
- Salinity in Australia
- Salinity control
- Soil salination

== Sources ==
- Department of Primary Industries (DPI), viewed June 2007.
- Young, A & Young R 2001, Soils in the Australian landscape, Oxford University Press, Melbourne.
- Dryland Salinity [Accessed: 15 Oct 2013].
