= TPD52 =

Protein-coding gene in the species Homo sapiens

Identifiers
- Aliases: TPD52, D52, N8L, PC-1, PrLZ, hD52, tumor protein D52
- External IDs: OMIM: 604068; MGI: 107749; HomoloGene: 38007; GeneCards: TPD52; OMA:TPD52 - orthologs

Gene location (Human)
Chr.	Chromosome 8 (human)
Band	8q21.13	Start	80,034,745 bp
Band	8q21.13	End	80,231,232 bp

Gene location (Mouse)
Chr.	Chromosome 3 (mouse)
Band	3|3 A1	Start	8,990,653 bp
Band	3|3 A1	End	9,069,783 bp
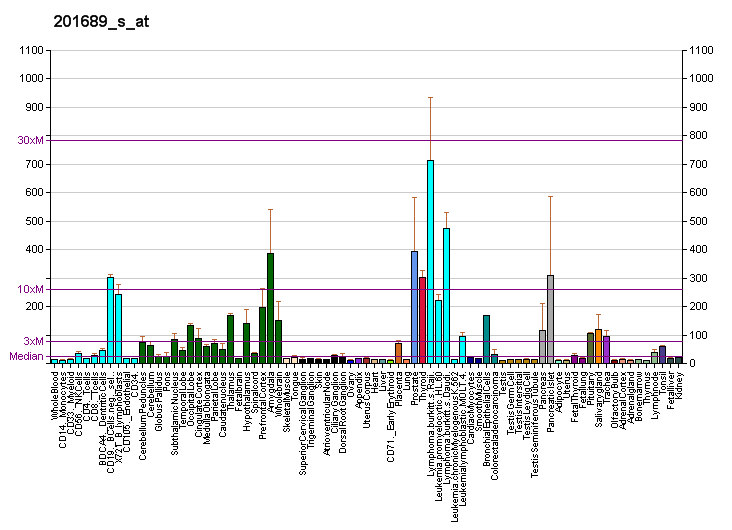

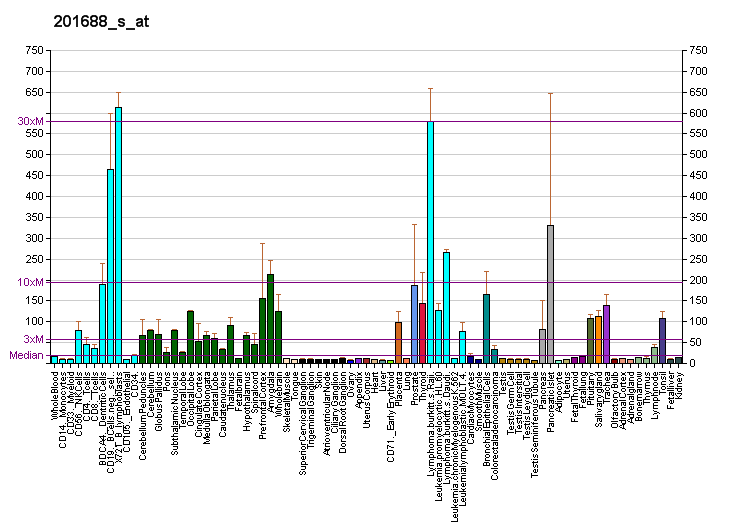

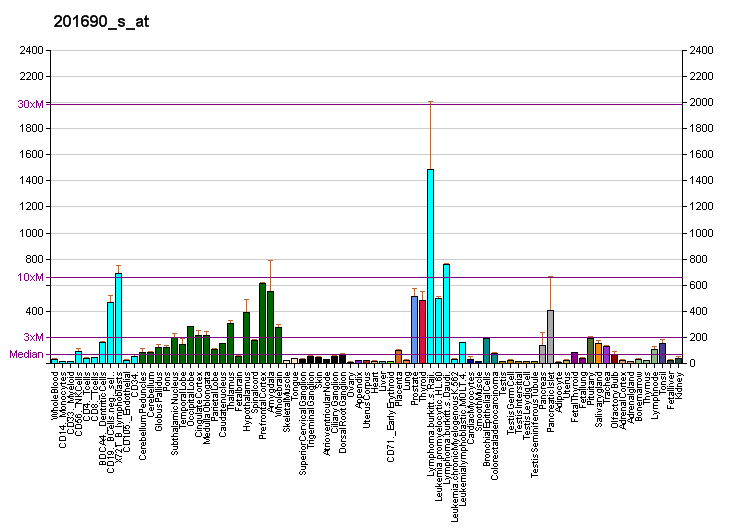
RNA expression pattern
Bgee	Human / Mouse (ortholog); Top expressed in: jejunal mucosa; lateral nuclear group of thalamus; secondary oocyte; mucosa of sigmoid colon; endothelial cell; islet of Langerhans; parotid gland; rectum; epithelium of nasopharynx; duodenum / Top expressed in: crypt of lieberkuhn of small intestine; pyloric antrum; salivary gland; left colon; lacrimal gland; submandibular gland; epithelium of stomach; granulocyte; neural layer of retina; ileum; More reference expression data
BioGPS	More reference expression data
Gene ontology
Molecular function	calcium ion binding; protein binding; protein homodimerization activity; protein heterodimerization activity
Cellular component	cytoplasm; perinuclear region of cytoplasm; endoplasmic reticulum
Biological process	B cell differentiation; anatomical structure morphogenesis; secretion
Sources:Amigo / QuickGO
Orthologs
Species	Human	Mouse
Entrez	7163	21985
Ensembl	ENSG00000076554	ENSMUSG00000027506
UniProt	P55327	Q62393
RefSeq (mRNA)	NM_001025252; NM_001025253; NM_001287140; NM_001287142; NM_001287143 NM_001287144; NM_005079; NM_001387779; NM_001387780	NM_001025261; NM_001025262; NM_001025263; NM_001025264; NM_009412 NM_001357072; NM_001357073; NM_001357074
RefSeq (protein)	NP_001020423; NP_001020424; NP_001274069; NP_001274071; NP_001274072 NP_001274073; NP_005070	NP_001020432; NP_001020433; NP_001020434; NP_001020435; NP_033438 NP_001344001; NP_001344002; NP_001344003
Location (UCSC)	Chr 8: 80.03 – 80.23 Mb	Chr 3: 8.99 – 9.07 Mb
PubMed search
- Wikidata
View/Edit Human	View/Edit Mouse

Tumor protein D52 is a protein that in humans is encoded by the TPD52 gene.

== Interactions ==
TPD52 has been shown to interact with TPD52L2, TPD52L1 and MAL2.
