= MAL2 (gene) =

Protein-coding gene in the species Homo sapiens

Identifiers
- Aliases: MAL2, mal, T-cell differentiation protein 2 (gene/pseudogene), mal, T cell differentiation protein 2 (gene/pseudogene), mal, T cell differentiation protein 2
- External IDs: OMIM: 609684; MGI: 2146021; GeneCards: MAL2

Gene location (Human)
Chr.	Chromosome 8 (human)
Band	8q24.12	Start	119,165,034 bp
Band	8q24.12	End	119,245,673 bp

Gene location (Mouse)
Chr.	Chromosome 15 (mouse)
Band	15|15 D1	Start	54,434,588 bp
Band	15|15 D1	End	54,466,243 bp
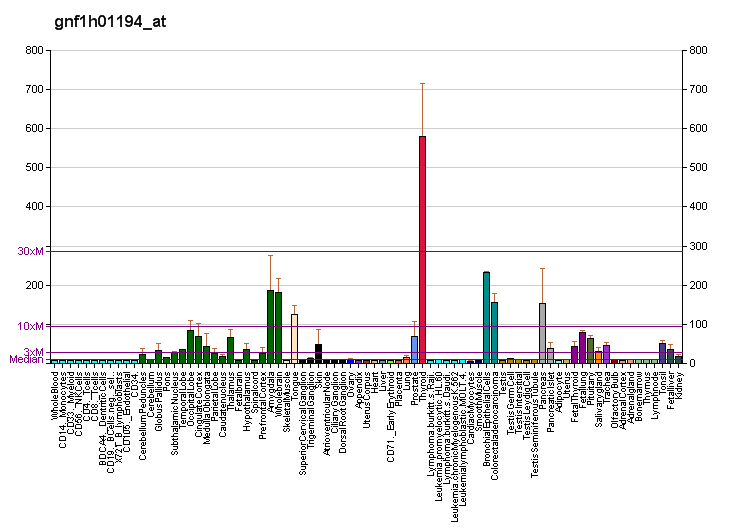

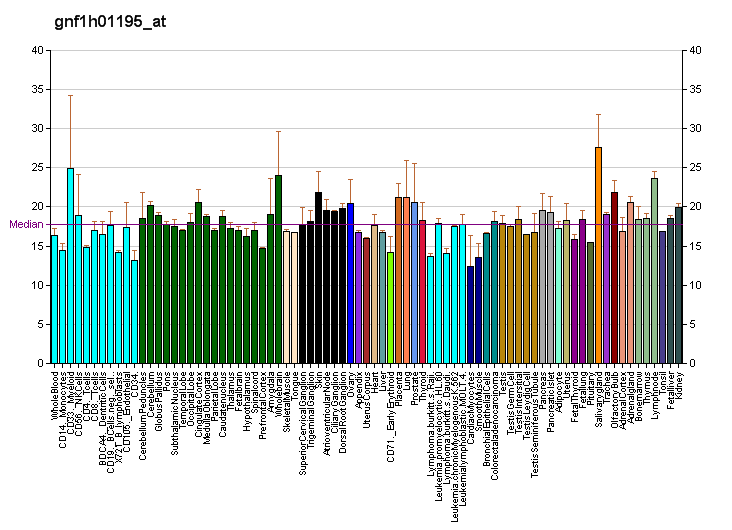
RNA expression pattern
Bgee	Human / Mouse (ortholog); Top expressed in: skin of arm; oral cavity; mucosa of pharynx; nasal epithelium; amniotic fluid; palpebral conjunctiva; human penis; gums; mucosa of colon; mucosa of sigmoid colon / Top expressed in: subiculum; right lung lobe; epithelium of stomach; Region I of hippocampus proper; primary motor cortex; mucous cell of stomach; cingulate gyrus; conjunctival fornix; anterior amygdaloid area; prefrontal cortex; More reference expression data
BioGPS	More reference expression data
Gene ontology
Molecular function	protein binding; structural constituent of myelin sheath
Cellular component	cytoplasm; perinuclear region of cytoplasm; plasma membrane; extracellular exosome; apical plasma membrane; membrane; endomembrane system; membrane raft; integral component of membrane; integral component of synaptic vesicle membrane; hippocampal mossy fiber to CA3 synapse; glutamatergic synapse
Biological process	transcytosis; membrane raft polarization; protein localization; myelination
Sources:Amigo / QuickGO
Orthologs
Databases	NCBI: entry; OMA: entry
Species	Human	Mouse
Entrez	114569	105853
Ensembl	ENSG00000147676	ENSMUSG00000024479
UniProt	Q969L2	Q8BI08
RefSeq (mRNA)	NM_052886	NM_178920
RefSeq (protein)	NP_443118; NP_443118.1	NP_849251
Location (UCSC)	Chr 8: 119.17 – 119.25 Mb	Chr 15: 54.43 – 54.47 Mb
PubMed search
- Wikidata
View/Edit Human	View/Edit Mouse

Protein MAL2 is a protein that in humans is encoded by the MAL2 gene.

This gene encodes a multispan transmembrane protein belonging to the MAL proteolipid family. The protein is a component of lipid rafts and, in polarized cells, it primarily localizes to endosomal structures beneath the apical membrane. It is required for transcytosis, an intracellular transport pathway used to deliver membrane-bound proteins and exogenous cargos from the basolateral to the apical surface.

== Interactions ==
MAL2 (gene) has been shown to interact with TPD52.
