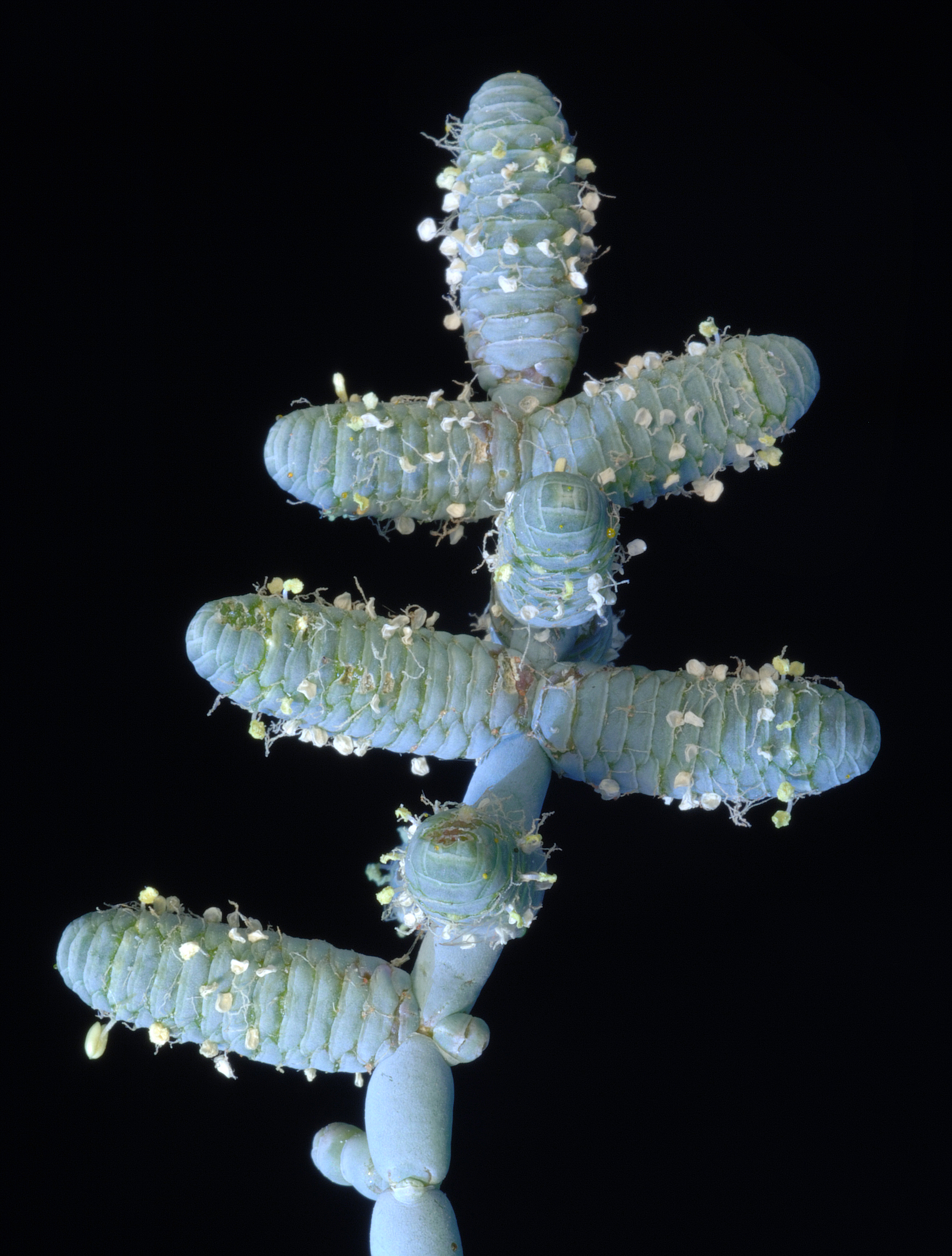

Scientific classification
- Kingdom: Plantae
- Clade: Tracheophytes
- Clade: Angiosperms
- Clade: Eudicots
- Order: Caryophyllales
- Family: Amaranthaceae
- Genus: Tecticornia
- Species: T. verrucosa

Binomial name
- Tecticornia verrucosa Paul G.Wilson
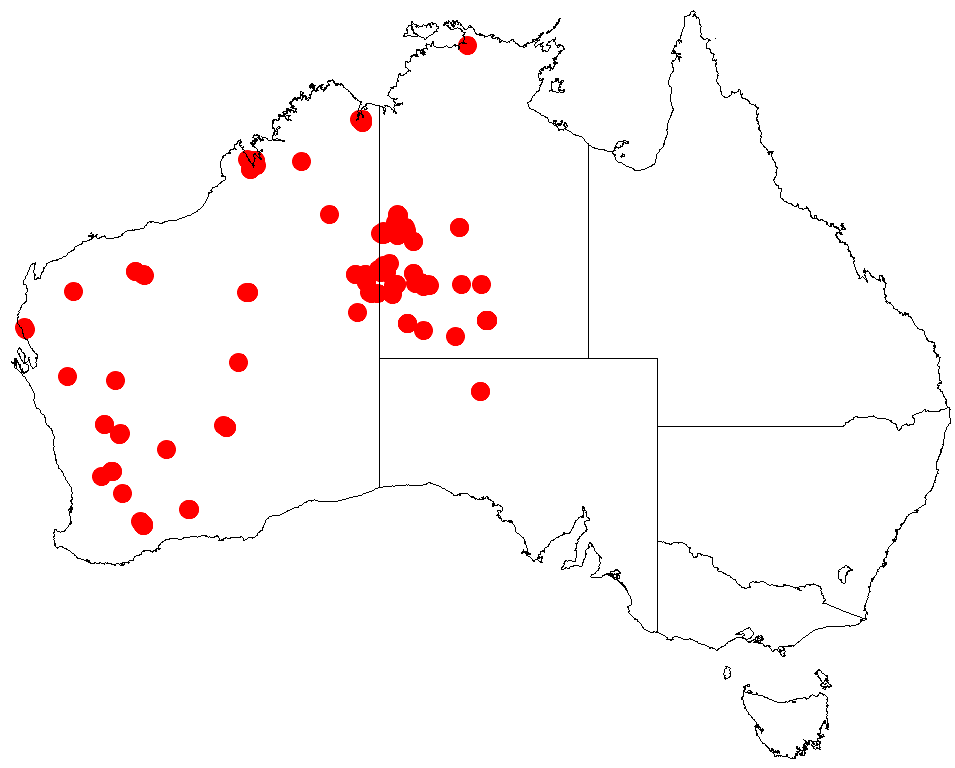
- Occurrence data from AVH

= Tecticornia verrucosa =

Species of flowering plant

Tecticornia verrrucosa is a species of plant that is succulent and halophyte (salt tolerant). This plant was a member of the Chenopodiaceae, which are now included in family Amaranthaceae.

T. verrucosa was first described in 1972 by Paul Wilson.

It is an annual or short-lived perennial which grows to 40 cm high, which branches at the occasionally woody base. The inflorescence is a set of opposite and decussate lateral sessile spikes, at right angles to the branch. They are cylindrical and 10–20 mm long by 6 mm diam. The flowers are triads with free tepals below and slightly united above.

It grows on coastal mud flats, slightly saline clay pans, and inland freshwater.

The Walmajarri people of the southern Kimberley call this plant Mungily.
