= Assemblages of plants and invertebrate animals of tumulus (organic mound) springs of the Swan Coastal Plain =

Assemblages of plants and invertebrate animals of tumulus (organic mound) springs of the Swan Coastal Plain are ecological communities in Western Australia. They have been managed under a number of other, similar names, including Mound springs of the Swan Coastal Plain and Communities of Tumulus Springs (Organic Mound Springs, Swan Coastal Plain). The tumulus mounds were common to a narrow range of groundwater discharge at the boundary of 'bassendean sand' and 'guildford clay', along the edge of the Gnangara Mound aquifer. The communities are critically endangered.

== Description ==
At the edge of the Gnangara Mound, where heavy guildford clays meet the bassendean dune system, bogs and swamps are created by the discharge of water from this aquifer. The clay and sand intersection on the Swan Coastal Plain, near the Darling Scarp, also produces permanent springs, giving rise to peat and sand mounds containing plant and invertebrate assemblages. The continuing vegetative growth produces microhabitat for many species. Penetration of water produced by regional hydrological forces alter and increase the size of the mounds by pushing material to the surface through the peat layers.

Fauna includes relict gondwanan species of invertebrates which are often unique to the remaining mounds. Flora of flooded gums (Eucalyptus rudis), bracken fern (Pteridium esculentum) and rushes (from the plant families Cyperaceae, Juncaceae and Restionaceae) occur around the springs. These are often remnant to climate change of the bioregion and are only otherwise found further south.

== Distribution and biology ==
Although once common to a narrow range between Guildford and Muchea, only three remain over an area of eight hectares. They are at Ellenbrook, Bullsbrook (Kings Mound Spring) and one near Muchea. Many species are highly adapted to the permanent water habitat and this may offer refuge from climate change for others. Many species are endemic to the tumulus mounds of the Swan Coastal Plain.

Faunal representatives of Acarina, Ostracoda, Nematoda, Cladocera, Copepoda, Oligochaeta, Tardigrada, Turbellaria and Insecta are found at most of the three remaining springs.

Aquatic mites have also been identified at the mounds:

Aturidae
Notoaturinae, gen. nov. sp. nov. - from Bullsbrook
Anisitsiellidae
Anisitsielides sp. nov. - Muchea
Crangonyctoid Amphipods
Paramelitidae, gen. nov. sp. nov. – Ellenbrook

Flora maintains the assemblage, with an

upper storey
of Banksia littoralis, Melaleuca preissiana, and Eucalyptus rudis.
Mid and low storey
vascular plants are:Agonis linearifolia:Astartea fascicularis and Cyclosorus interruptus and the fern Pteridium esculentum.
Non-vascular plants in the community are: Lycopodiella serpentina (bog clubmoss), Riccardia aequicellularis, Jungermanniaceae Jungermannia inundata, Goebelobryum unguiculatum and Lepidoziaceae Hyalolepidozia longiscypha.

== Threat and status ==
Most of these communities were destroyed by land clearing in the period following colonisation. Human activities have reduced the range of mound spring communities by 97% since settlement. Dams and infilling destroyed many communities during the agricultural development of the area. Further reduction to their range was produced by housing developments. The mound springs are critically endangered and the three remaining communities are reserved by either the state government or urban development reserve systems. All of the cohabiting species share the threat of extinction from altered environmental conditions. Altered fire regimes, involving blazes of higher intensity and the exploitation of the associated aquifers directly threaten the remaining tumulus spring assemblages. Grazing by cattle caused direct damage to species and their trampling and dung also facilitated invasion by wetland weed species. These introduced plant species, such as Isolepis prolifera and Pennisetum clandestinum, affect these ecological communities by displacing endemic species. Grassy weed species increase the risk of fire and woody ones draw heavily on the water of the spring. The interaction of these threats reduce biodiversity and continue to impel the extinction of these eco-communities. All three identified mound springs and their species are eligible for State listing and protection.
