= Threatened ecological community =

Australian term for endangered ecosystems

Threatened ecological community is a term used in Australia for ecosystems which are threatened by changes in community structure, invasive species, or habitat degradation. Federally, threatened ecological communities are identified and protected under the Environment Protection and Biodiversity Conservation Act 1999 under three categories: vulnerable, endangered, and critically endangered. Some states also have legislation to cover these. In New South Wales, for example, ecosystems may be gazetted as threatened under the Threatened Species Conservation Act 1995, and in Western Australia they may be protected under the Environmental Protection Act 1986.

== See also ==
- List of threatened ecological communities of Australia
- List of threatened ecological communities of Western Australia
