= Newdegate, Western Australia =

Newdegate
- Town
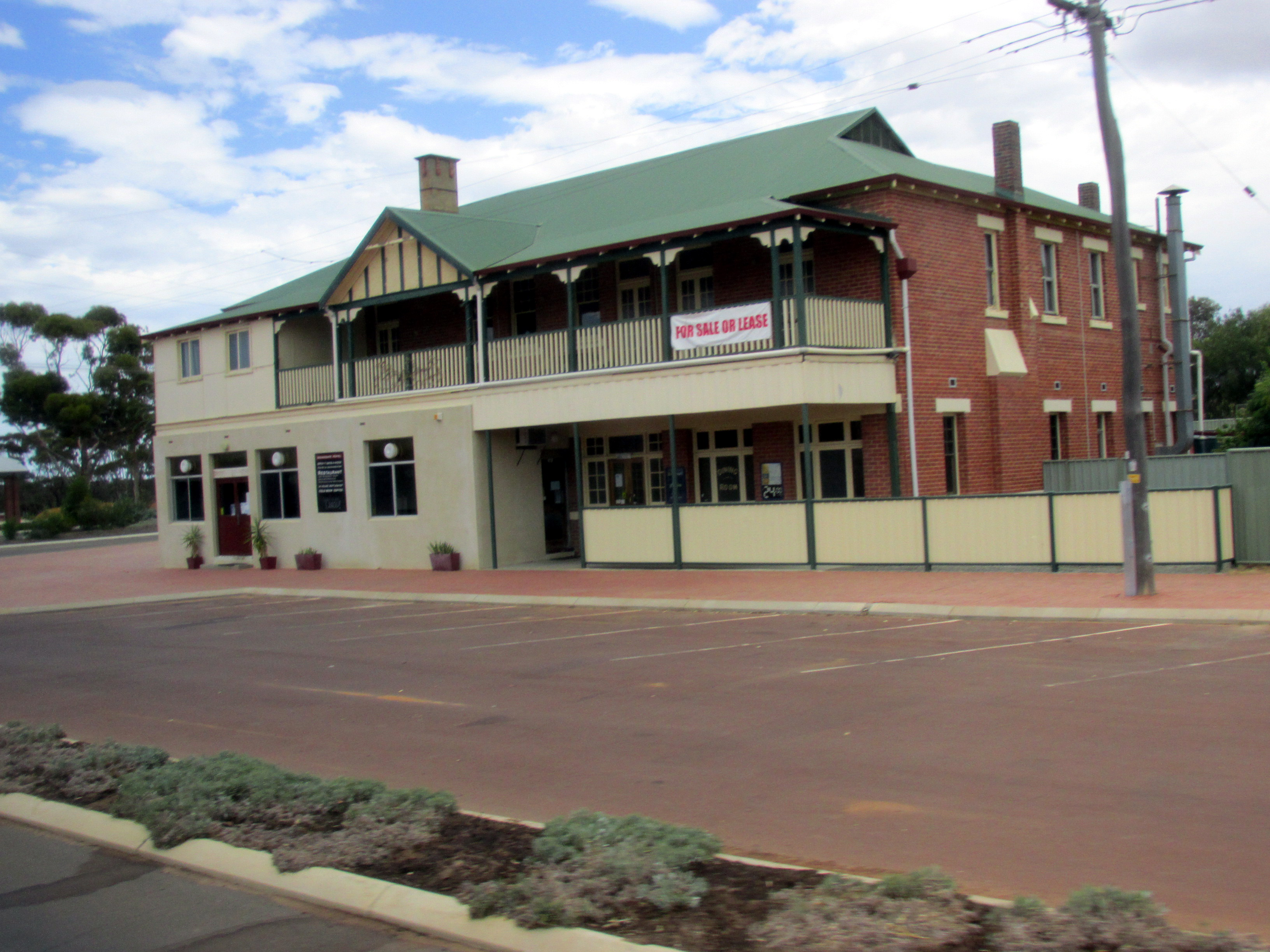
- Newdegate Hotel

- Interactive map of Newdegate
- Coordinates: 33.093°S 119.024°E
- Country: Australia
- State: Western Australia
- LGA: Shire of Lake Grace
- Location: 399 km (248 mi) southeast of Perth; 52 km (32 mi) east of Lake Grace; 92 km (57 mi) north of Jerramungup
- Established: 1925

Government
  - State electorate: Roe
  - Federal division: O'Connor
- Elevation: 320 m (1,050 ft)

Population
  - Total: 159 (SAL 2021)
- Postcode: 6355
- Mean max temp: 23.6 °C (74.5 °F)
- Mean min temp: 8.8 °C (47.8 °F)
- Annual rainfall: 359.6 mm (14.16 in)

Newdegate is a townsite in the Wheatbelt agricultural region, 399 km south-east of Perth and 52 km east of Lake Grace in Western Australia. The townsite was gazetted in 1925 and honours Sir Francis Newdegate, the Governor of Western Australia from 1920 to 1924. The Department of Primary Industries and Regional Development operates one of its 13 research stations in the area of Newdegate.

Newdegate is situated in the heart of the south-eastern wheatbelt of Western Australia – about halfway between Perth in the west and Esperance in the south-east. It is a very successful grain and sheep farming area. Newdegate is central to the Western Mallee subregion of the Interim Biogeographic Regionalisation for Australia. It is a sparsely populated subregion with an area of about 47,000 square kilometres (18,147 sq mi).

The Wagin to Newdegate railway line was completed in 1926, thereby connecting the town to the Western Australian rail network.

The local hall was opened in 1926 by Mr. B Carruthers from Lake Grace. A gold reef was found to the north east of town the same year.

In 1932 the Wheat Pool of Western Australia announced that the town would have two grain elevators, each fitted with an engine, installed at the railway siding.

The surrounding areas produce wheat and other cereal crops. The town is a primary receival site for Cooperative Bulk Handling.

== Geography ==
=== Climate ===
Newdegate has a semi-arid climate (Köppen: BSk); with warm to hot, dry summers and mild to cool, slightly wetter winters. Extreme temperatures ranged from 46.7 °C (116.1 °F) on 3 February 2007 to −4.3 °C (24.3 °F) on 15 September 2018. The wettest recorded day was 29 January 1990 with 106.8 mm (4.20 in) of rainfall.

Climate data for Newdegate (33.11°S 118.84°E) (320 m (1,050 ft) AMSL) (1954–2025)
Month	Jan	Feb	Mar	Apr	May	Jun	Jul	Aug	Sep	Oct	Nov	Dec	Year
Record high °C (°F)	45.9 (114.6)	46.7 (116.1)	40.9 (105.6)	36.7 (98.1)	30.8 (87.4)	26.8 (80.2)	22.7 (72.9)	29.0 (84.2)	34.1 (93.4)	37.7 (99.9)	42.6 (108.7)	43.7 (110.7)	46.7 (116.1)
Mean daily maximum °C (°F)	31.5 (88.7)	30.7 (87.3)	28.1 (82.6)	24.1 (75.4)	20.1 (68.2)	16.7 (62.1)	15.4 (59.7)	16.4 (61.5)	19.2 (66.6)	23.6 (74.5)	27.3 (81.1)	29.9 (85.8)	23.6 (74.5)
Mean daily minimum °C (°F)	13.8 (56.8)	14.1 (57.4)	12.9 (55.2)	10.2 (50.4)	7.0 (44.6)	5.2 (41.4)	4.3 (39.7)	4.3 (39.7)	4.9 (40.8)	7.0 (44.6)	9.9 (49.8)	11.7 (53.1)	8.8 (47.8)
Record low °C (°F)	4.7 (40.5)	4.2 (39.6)	3.1 (37.6)	1.0 (33.8)	−2.6 (27.3)	−3.2 (26.2)	−3.8 (25.2)	−3.2 (26.2)	−4.3 (24.3)	−3.1 (26.4)	−0.7 (30.7)	2.7 (36.9)	−4.3 (24.3)
Average precipitation mm (inches)	17.8 (0.70)	21.6 (0.85)	22.1 (0.87)	26.3 (1.04)	40.7 (1.60)	47.7 (1.88)	48.1 (1.89)	45.8 (1.80)	32.2 (1.27)	23.5 (0.93)	21.0 (0.83)	14.4 (0.57)	359.6 (14.16)
Average precipitation days (≥ 0.2 mm)	3.0	3.6	4.2	6.6	9.3	12.8	15.0	13.4	10.6	6.9	5.3	3.5	94.2
Average afternoon relative humidity (%)	30	30	33	40	48	55	58	55	48	35	30	27	41
Average dew point °C (°F)	7.3 (45.1)	8.1 (46.6)	7.4 (45.3)	7.1 (44.8)	6.7 (44.1)	6.0 (42.8)	5.5 (41.9)	5.7 (42.3)	5.5 (41.9)	4.1 (39.4)	4.2 (39.6)	5.1 (41.2)	6.1 (42.9)
Source: Bureau of Meteorology (1954–2025)

=== Field days ===
The annual Newdegate machinery field days have been held for more than 50 years. Displays include machinery and farm equipment as well as sheep and shearing competitions, fleece competitions, a ewe/hogget competition, cattle displays, wine tasting, art competition and exhibition, live music and entertainment. In 2007 a natural fibre fashion award was held.
