= List of State Register of Heritage Places in the Shire of Broomehill-Tambellup =

The State Register of Heritage Places is maintained by the Heritage Council of Western Australia. As of 2026, 215 places are heritage-listed in the Shire of Broomehill-Tambellup, of which five are on the State Register of Heritage Places.

== List ==
=== State Register of Heritage Places ===
The Western Australian State Register of Heritage Places, as of 2026, lists the following five state registered places within the Shire of Broomehill-Tambellup:

Place name	Place #	Street number	Street name	Suburb or town	Co-ordinates	Notes & former names	Photo
St Elizabeth's Anglican Church	306	Corner	Janitor & Davine Streets	Broomehill	33.846644°S 117.638898°E	Police Station and Court House, St Elizabeth of Hungary Anglican Church	
Broomehill Shire Hall and Road Board Offices (former)	308	30360	Great Southern Highway	Broomehill	33.844344°S 117.638814°E	Town Hall, Sheridans Hall	
Jones's Buildings (former)	310	10	Journal Street	Broomehill	33.845383°S 117.638057°E	Broomehill General Store	
St Peter's Church	2548		Pindellup Road	Pindellup	33.980773°S 117.495269°E	Church of the Wildwoods, St Peter's Anglican Church	
Martinup	3322	1841	Broomehill-Gnowangerup Road	Broomehill East	33.88747°S 117.856164°E	Martinup Homestead & Outbuildings, Martinup Homestead, Martinup Spring (or Soak)	

=== Shire of Broomehill-Tambellup heritage-listed places ===
The following places are heritage listed in the Shire of Broomehill-Tambellup but are not State registered:

Place name	Place #	Street number	Street name	Suburb or town	Notes & former names	Photo
Broomehill Hotel	307		Jasper Street	Broomehill	Imperial Hotel	
Broomehill Post Office and Quarters	309	Corner	Journal & India Streets	Broomehill		
Presbyterian Church (former)	311	Corner	Journal & Jasper Streets	Broomehill	Road Board Hall, Historical Society Museum, Mechanic's Institute, Broomehill Museum	
Crosby Agricultural Hall	2537	Corner	Crosby & Pindellup Roads	Tambellup		
Tambellup Post Office	2538	Corner	Crowden & Norrish Streets	Tambellup		
Tambellup Hotel	2539		Garrity Street	Tambellup		
Tambellup Police Station & Quarters (former)	2540		Garrity Street	Tambellup	Willow Craft Shop & Residence	
Toolbrunup School (former)	2541	Corner	Pootenup & Toolbrunup Roads	Toolbrunup		
Uniting Church & Methodist Church (former) Precinct	2542		Henry Street	Tambellup	Uniting Hall & Travelling Minister's Quarters	
Bank of New South Wales & Quarters (NSW)(former)	2543		Norrish Street	Tambellup	Tambellup Health Centre	
Agricultural Hall (former), Tambellup	2544		Norrish Street	Tambellup	Shire Hall, Road Board Offices (former)	
St Mary's Anglican Church	2545		North Terrace	Tambellup		
Shearers Quarters	2546		Saggers Property	Tambellup	Hospital (former)	
Tambellup Railway Station (former) Precinct	2547	20	Garrity Street	Tambellup	The Wool Station, Wool Foundation Headquarters	
House, 11A Davine Street	2960	11a	Davine Street	Broomehill		
Nanamillup Homestead (former) & Outbuildings	3599		Broomehill-Kojonup Road 12 km West of Broomehill	Broomehill	Fairfield, Graham's Mill	
Pindellup Pioneers Cemetery	3995	Corner	Pindellup & North West Roads	Pindellup		
Norrish Homestead, Tambellup	4005	3319	Gnowangerup-Tambellup Road	Tambellup	Tamberllerup	
Corner Shop Museum	4556	36	Norrish Street	Tambellup		
Infant Health Centre, Tambellup	4557	18	Crowden Street	Tambellup	Women's Friendly Rest Rooms (former)	
JS Roe Memorial Plaque	6184		Broomehill-Kojonup Road, front of Eticup	Broomehill		
Eticup Memorial	6186		Broomehill-Kojonup Road, front of Eticup	Broomehill		
Krakouer's Store, Eticup - Site	6187		Broomehill-Kojonup Road	Broomehill		
Whitton House Ruins - Site	6188		Eticup Settlement	Broomehill		
Thomas Francis Carmody Grave	6189		Condeena property	Broomehill		
James Bridges Grave, Beejenup	6190		Pallinup Road	Broomehill		
George Howard Annice Grave, Hayfield	6191		Flat Rocks Road	Broomehill		
Hillview	6192		Latham Street	Broomehill		
Coorinyup Bridge over Wadjeganup River	6193		Flat Rocks Road	Broomehill	MRWA 4238	
Beejenup Wayside Inn - Site of	6194		Pallinup Road	Broomehill		
Broomehill Railway Station, Ficus & Ironbark Trees	6195		Jasper Street	Broomehill		
Shire of Broomehill Offices & Library	6196	30360	Great Southern Highway	Broomehill		
Condeena Estate, Broomehill	6198		Broomehill-Kojonup Road	Broomehill West	Goblup Estate	
Sunnyside Homestead & Men's Quarters	6200		Broomehill-Kojonup Road	Broomehill		
Nardlah Homestead	6202		Nardlah Road	Broomehill		
Langwell	6203		Brassey Road	Broomehill	Shiloh College	
Moorellup (former)	6204		Pallinup Road	Broomehill	Fermoy	
St Peter's Church, Eticup - Site	6205		Greenhills Road	Broomehill		
Oaklands School	6206		Broomehill-Kojonup Road	Broomehill		
Roundwood School - Site	6207		Beejenup Road	Broomehill		
Nigalup School - Site	6208		Pallinup Road	Broomehill		
Flat Rocks School - Site	6209		Flat Rocks Road	Broomehill		
Eticup Cemetery	6210		Greenhills Road	Broomehill		
Broomehill Cemetery	6211		Kojonup Road West of	Broomehill		
Broomehill Recreational Complex	6213		Tie Line Road	Broomehill		
Flat Rocks Tennis Club	6214		Flat Rocks Road	Broomehill	Flat Rocks Hall	
Broomehill War Memorial	6215	Corner	Jasper & Ivy Streets	Broomehill		
Holland Track Memorial	6216		Jasper Street	Broomehill		
Broomehill RSL & Citizens' Hall	6918	Corner	Journal & India Streets	Broomehill		
Bakery - Site of	12247	Corner	Taylor & George Streets	Tambellup		
Bessen's Garage & Residence Site	12248		Crowden Street	Tambellup	Tambellup Deli	
Jam Creek (South) Bridge	12249		Garrity Street	Tambellup		
Parnell St Bridge (Jam Creek) - Site of	12250		Parnell Street	Tambellup		
Butcher Shop	12251	80	Norrish Street	Tambellup		
Alan Jones' Butcher Shop	12252		Norrish Street	Tambellup		
Butcher Shop (former)	12253		Garrity Street	Tambellup	Site of the goldborough Mort. Agency	
Cemetery Site No. 2	12254		Great Southern Highway	Tambellup		
Clay Pits/Brickworks - Site of	12255		Saggers Road	Tambellup		
Co-op Managers Residence	12256	Corner	Taylor & Owen Streets	Tambellup		
Stirling Co-operative Store	12257	28	Norrish Street	Tambellup		
Croquet Club (former)	12258	Corner	Taylor & Henry Streets	Tambellup	Children's Playground	
CWA Rest Rooms, Tambellup	12259		Henry Street	Tambellup		
Diprose Court - Site	12262	Corner	Taylor/Henry/Crowden Streets	Tambellup		
Flood Indicator Board	12263		Norrish Street	Tambellup		
General Store	12265		Norrish Street	Tambellup	former Richardson's Store	
Golf Club Clubhouse	12266		Bourke Street	Tambellup		
Headmaster's House (former)	12268	284	Norrish Street	Tambellup		
Herbert's Garage	12269	31	Garrity Street	Tambellup		
Hitching Rail	12270		Norrish Street	Tambellup		
Nurse Turner's Private Hospital (former) - Site	12271	Corner	Main West Road & Lovegrove Street	Tambellup		
Government Cottage Hospital (former) - Site	12272		Saggers Street	Tambellup		
Lovegrove	12274		Lovegrove Street	Tambellup		
Masonic Hall	12275	7	Tambellup West Road	Tambellup		
Migrant Transit Camp - Site of	12276		Great Southern Highway/Railway Line at Garrity Street	Tambellup		
Nursing Post and Residence	12277		Taylor Street	Tambellup		
Page House	12279	Corner	Main West & Johnston Roads	Tambellup		
Pine Trees - Site of	12280	Corner	Norrish South & Parnell Street	Tambellup		
Police Station - Site of	12281		Great Southern Highway	Tambellup		
Tambellup Police Station & Court House Precinct	12282		Owen Street	Tambellup		
Post Master's House	12283		Norrish Street	Tambellup		
Tambellup Post Office (former)	12284	Corner	Taylor & Crowden Streets	Tambellup	House	
Baptist Chapel (former)	12287		Taylor Street	Tambellup	Priest's House, Roman Catholic Church of St Michael's Prec, Sister's of Motor Mission Convent	
R.S.L. Hall	12288	Corner	Garrity Street & Great Southern Highway	Tambellup		
Tambellup Primary School	12289		Taylor Street	Tambellup		
Tambellup School - First Site	12293		Owen Street	Tambellup		
Shire Offices and Council Chambers	12294		Norrish Street	Tambellup		
Hairdresser's Salon & Billiard Room (former)	12295	34	Norrish Street	Tambellup	Snowy Wilson's Electrical Shop, Tea Rooms/Deli, West Australian Bank	
Sports Ground	12296		East Terrace	Tambellup		
Tea Rooms - Site of	12297	16	Crowden Street	Tambellup		
Tennis Courts & Pavilion	12298		East Terrace	Tambellup		
Pine Trees, Tambellup School - Minnie Saggers	12299	Corner	Taylor & Howard Streets	Tambellup		
Turner Memorial Stone	12300	Corner	Main Street West & Lovegrove Street	Tambellup		
Tambellup War Memorial	12302		Norrish Street	Tambellup		
Water Fountain	12303		Norrish Street	Tambellup		
Tambellup Water Tower	12304		Norrish Street	Tambellup		
Wheat Storage Bin - Site of	12306		Garrity Street	Tambellup		
Addison House - Site of	12307		North West Road, River bank	Tambellup		
Agricultural Society Showgrounds No 1 - Site	12308		Garrity Street	Tambellup		
Agricultural Society Showgrounds No 2 - Site	12309		Garrity Street	Tambellup		
Agricultural Society Showgrounds No 3 - Site	12310		Main West Road	Tambellup		
Lowboi (former)	12311		Main West Road	Tambellup	Binninup Pool	
Boatshed	12312		Russell Street, Banks of Gordon River	Tambellup		
Bobalong Sports Ground	12313	Corner	Crosby & Pindellup Roads	Tambellup		
Bobalong Hall - Site of	12318	Corner	Crosby & Pindellup Roads	Tambellup		
Sagger's Brickworks (Kilns with 3 fires) - Site	12319		Sagger's Property	Tambellup	Saggers Paddock	
Brickworks - Site of	12320		Maninetti's Farm	Tambellup		
Bush Shelter Church - Site of	12321		Pindellup Road	Pindellup		
Cemetery Reserve	12322		Gnowangerup-Tambellup Road	Tambellup		
Charcoal Pits - Site of	12323		Tambellup West Road	Tambellup		
Clemies Fence	12324	Corner	Johnston & Nymbup Roads	Tambellup		
Coach Stop - Site of	12325	Corner	Warrenup & Main West Roads	Tambellup		
Corduroy Crossing at Wadseranhue River	12326		Greenhills South Road	Tambellup		
Cricket Pitch	12327		Great Southern Highway	Tambellup		
Cricket Pitch	12328		Pootenup Road	Toolbrunup		
Crofton Soak/Well	12329		Great Southern Highway	Tambellup		
Tambellup Dam Site No. 1, B Webster's property	12330		Jam Creek Road 4 km East of	Tambellup		
Tambellup Dam Site No. 2	12331	off	Crosby/Tambellup West Roads, Railway Reserve	Tambellup		
Tambellup Dam Site No. 3	12332		Tambellup-Gnowangerup Road, Dartnall Railway Reserve	Tambellup	part of the former Ongerup branch railway	
Tambellup Dam Site No. 4	12333		Hassell Road, Toolbrunup Railway Reserve	Tambellup	part of the former Ongerup branch railway	
Dartnall Cottage/Shed/Mill	12334		Gnowangerup Road	Tambellup		
Ellensfield Ruin	12335		North West Road, River bank	Tambellup		
Golf Clubhouse - Site of	12336			Tambellup		
Golf Course (Saggers) - Site, Saggers Property	12337		Saggers Road	Tambellup		
Gordon River Flying Fox & Footbridge - Site of	12338			Tambellup		
Grave Site, Norrish Homestead	12339		Gnowangerup Road	Tambellup		
Grove's Cottage	12340		Toolbrunup Road	Tambellup		
Hassell's Stock Route	12341			Tambellup		
Hazeldene Ruins	12342		Tambellup West Road	Tambellup		
Hodgeson's Campsite	12343		Hodgson Road	Tambellup		
Holme Park	12344		Witham Road	Tambellup	Parnell Homestead	
House Ruins	12345		Dawson Road	Tambellup		
Hull's (Tom) Homestead	12346		Watergarrup Road	Tambellup		
Invermay	12348		Beejenup Road	Tambellup		
Kurroing Ruin	12349			Tambellup		
Kylie Ruin	12350		Tambellup West Road	Tambellup		
Manyfields	12351		Gnowangerup Road	Tambellup		
Marlo Homestead	12352		North West Road	Tambellup		
Minilla Ruin	12353		Tambellup West Road	Tambellup		
Moonies Stone House	12354		Warrenup Road	Tambellup		
The Eyrie (former)	12355		Paul Valley Road	Tambellup	Moree	
Moree Mud Brick House	12356		Paul Valley Road	Tambellup		
Mud Brick House	12357		Nymbup Road	Tambellup		
Mystic Park	12358		Russell Street	Tambellup	Saggers Homestead	
Ochre Pits	12359	Off	Albany Highway	Tambellup		
Maslem's Orchard	12360		Paul Valley Road	Tambellup		
Brookland Out-House Kitchen	12361		Crosby Road	Tambellup		
Plunge Dip	12362		Tambellup West Road	Tambellup		
Prisoner of War (POW) Control Centre - Site of	12363		Main West Road	Tambellup		
Tambellup Power House - Site of	12364		Crowden Street	Tambellup		
Pump Pool	12365		Gordon River	Tambellup		
Race Club - Site of	12366		Paul Valley Road	Tambellup		
Tingerup Race Club - Site of	12367		Great Southern Highway	Tingerup		
Railway line to Gnowangerup	12368			Tambellup	part of the former Ongerup branch railway	
Railway Siding - Dartnall	12369			Dartnall	part of the former Ongerup branch railway	
Railway Siding - Pootenup	12370		Great Southern Highway	Pootenup	part of the Great Southern Railway	
Railway Siding - Toolbrunup	12371			Toolbrunup	part of the former Ongerup branch railway	
Railway Siding - Wansborough	12372			Wansborough	part of the Great Southern Railway	
Sugar Gums, Peppercorn Trees & Gravel Pit	12373	Corner	Great Southern Highway & Hassell Road	Tambellup	Reserve 94	
Rifle Range Mounds on Moree	12374		Paul Valley Road	Tambellup		
Rifle Range Site	12375		Hankinson Road	Tambellup		
Binniup School - Site of	12376			Binniup		
Bobalong School - Site of	12377			Bobalong		
Brookdale School - Site of	12378			Brookdale		
Moonies Hill School - Site & Moreton Bay Fig Tree	12379	Corner	Bessen & Moonies Hill Roads	Moonies Hill		
Ornabullup School - Site of	12380		Greenbushes Road S	Ornabullup		
Tingerup School - Site of	12381		Great Southern Highway	Tingerup		
Shearing Shed and Men's Hut, Rosedale	12382		Gnowangerup Road	Tambellup		
WAGR Sheep/Cattle Holding Yard Site	12383		Garrity Street Railway Reserve	Tambellup		
Sheep Dip	12384		Tallent Road	Tambellup		
Sheep Sale Yard Site No. 1	12385		Taylor Street	Tambellup		
Sheep Sale Yards No. 2	12386	Off	Great Southern Highway	Tambellup		
Jam Creek Sheep Wash Pool	12387		Jam Creek Road	Jam Creek		
Silo at Taylor Homestead	12388			Tambellup		
Silo on Richardson Property	12389		Great Southern Highway	Tambellup		
Slee House	12390			Tambellup		
First Sportsground - Site of	12391		Main West Road	Tambellup		
Spring Hill Residence	12392			Tambellup		
Stock Route	12393		Paul Valley/Watergarrup Roads	Tambellup		
Tang Wang Vegetable Garden, Manyfields	12394			Tambellup		
Tank Stand	12395		Main West Road	Pindellup		
Tingerup Hall - Site of	12396	Corner	Johnson & Watergarrup Roads	Tingerup		
Tunney Tennis Courts and Cricket Pitch	12398		Albany Highway	Tunney		
Tunney Township Site	12399	North of	Albany Highway	Tunney		
The Ranch (former)	12400		Binniup Road	Tambellup	Ukurrie	
Uranbah Homestead	12401			Tambellup		
Wansbrough Hall - Site of	12402			Wansborough	Wansborough Hall - Site of	
Well	12403		Albany Highway	Tambellup		
White Gum & Pine Trees	12404		Great Southern Highway	Tambellup		
Windermere	12405		Warrenup Road	Tambellup		
Woodlands	12406			Pindellup		
Woolshed and Stone Plunge Dip	12407		Nymbup Road	Tambellup		
Broomehill Town Centre Precinct	12413		Ivy, Jasper, Journal and India Streets	Broomehill		
Holland's Track	16818			Multiple LGAs		
Tambellup Police Station	17357		Owen Street	Tambellup		
Uniting Hall & Travelling Ministers Quarters	23824		Henry Street	Tambellup	Methodist Church	
Workmen's Cottage	23831		Broomehill-Kojonup Road	Broomehill		
Moreton Bay Fig Tree	23832	Corner	Bessen & Moonies Hill Roads	Moonies Hill		
Ficus and Ironbark Tree	23838		Jasper Street	Broomehill		
Woolshed and Yards	23873		Tambellup-Gnowangerup Road	Tambellup		
Sunnyside Men's Quarters	23908		Broomehill-Kojonup Road	Broomehill		
Tambellup Railway Stationmaster's House	23939		Norrish Street	Tambellup		
Broomehill Railway Station	24407		Jasper Street	Broomehill	part of the Great Southern Railway	
Uniting Church & Methodist Church (former)	24426		Henry Street	Tambellup		
Tambellup Railway Station (former)	24436		Norrish Street	Tambellup		
Sunnyside Homestead	24449		Broomehill-Kojonup Road	Broomehill		
House, 56 Leathley Street, Broomehill	25331	56	Leathley Streetreet	Broomehill		
Wadjekanup River Road Bridge, Broomehill West	25490			Broomehill West	MRWA Bridge 4233	
Pallinup River Road Bridge	25491			Broomehill East	MRWA Bridge 4241	
Broomehill Council Machinery Shed (former)	25911	30374	Great Southern Highway	Broomehill		
MRWA Bridge 354, Northam Cranbrook over Ewlyamartup Creek, Broomehill East	270202		Northam Cranbrook over Ewlyamartup Creek	Broomehill East		
