= Broomehill West, Western Australia =

Locality in the Shire of Broomehill-Tambellup, Western Australia

Broomehill West
- Interactive map of Broomehill West
- Coordinates: 33.87571°S 117.47861°E
- Country: Australia
- State: Western Australia
- LGA: Shire of Broomehill–Tambellup
- Location: 257 km (160 mi) SE of Perth; 137 km (85 mi) N of Albany; 21 km (13 mi) SW of Katanning

Government
  - State electorate: Roe
  - Federal division: O'Connor

Area
  - Total: 627.1 km^{2} (242.1 sq mi)

Population
  - Total: 173 (SAL 2021)
- Postcode: 6318
Localities around Broomehill West
| Cherry Tree Pool | Carrolup | Murdong |
| Kojonup | Broomehill West | Broomehill East |
| Lumeah | Borderdale | Bobalong |

Broomehill West is a rural locality of the Shire of Broomehill–Tambellup of the Great Southern region of Western Australia, adjacent to the town of Broomehill. The Great Southern Highway and the Great Southern Railway, for the most part, form the eastern border of the locality. A small part of the gazetted townsite of Peringillup and a major part of the Peringillup Nature Reserve are located within Broomehill West.

Broomehill West is located on the traditional land of the Kaniyang people of the Noongar nation.

The townsite of Peringillup, located in the south-east of Broomehill West and in neighbouring Broomehill East, was established in 1907 as a siding on the Great Southern Railway. The town of Broomehill was established just prior to the completion of this railway in 1889, and gazetted in 1890.

The heritage listed Condeena Estate is located within Broomehill West, dating back to 1904.

== Nature reserve ==
The Peringillup Nature Reserve was gazetted on 12 October 1979, has a size of 2.18 square kilometres (0.84 mi^{2}), and is located within the Avon Wheatbelt bioregion.
