= Wansbrough, Western Australia =

Locality in the Shire of Broomehill-Tambellup, Western Australia

Wansbrough
- Interactive map of Wansbrough
- Coordinates: 34.17545°S 117.74680°E
- Country: Australia
- State: Western Australia
- LGA: Shire of Broomehill–Tambellup
- Location: 301 km (187 mi) SE of Perth; 98 km (61 mi) N of Albany; 54 km (34 mi) S of Katanning

Government
  - State electorate: Roe
  - Federal division: O'Connor

Area
  - Total: 360.7 km^{2} (139.3 sq mi)

Population
  - Total: 60 (SAL 2021)
- Postcode: 6320
Localities around Wansbrough
Moonies Hill	Tambellup	Dartnall
Moonies Hill	Wansbrough	Lake Toolbrunup
Cranbrook	Cranbrook	Lake Toolbrunup

Wansbrough is a rural locality of the Shire of Broomehill–Tambellup in the Great Southern region of Western Australia. The Great Southern Highway and the Great Southern Railway run through the locality from north to south, while the Gordon River forms its north-eastern boundary. The Wansbrough and the Beejenup Nature Reserves are fully located in the locality, while the far northern end of the Balicup Lake Nature Reserve protrudes into the south of Wansbrough. The small eastern part of the gazetted townsite of Pootenup is located in Wansbrough, while the western part is located in Cranbrook, with the border running parallel to the railway line.

== History ==
Wansbrough is located on the traditional land of the Kaniyang and Koreng peoples, both of the Noongar nation.

Wansbrough was a siding on the Great Southern Railway until 1992, when the siding closed. The siding originally opened in 1905 as Tingerupp, which was altered to Tingerup and eventually renamed to Wansbrough in 1926.

The townsite of Pootenup was also established as a railway siding and gazetted as a town in 1908. The townsite is now forested and has no buildings, with the majority of the western side taken up by the Pootenup Nature Reserve.

The heritage listed sites of the Tingerup race club, school and hall are located within Wansbrough, south of Wansbrough Nature Reserve. The racecourse is on the lake formerly called Lake Tingerup, now Racecourse Lake, part of the Cranbrook Pink Lakes.

== Nature reserves ==
The Wansbrough Nature Reserve was gazetted on 14 July 1978, has a size of 1.26 square kilometres (0.49 mi^{2}), and is located within the Avon Wheatbelt bioregion.

The Beejenup Nature Reserve was gazetted on 23 October 1970, has a size of 0.5 square kilometres (0.19 mi^{2}), and is located within the Avon Wheatbelt and Esperance Plains bioregions.

The Balicup Lake Nature Reserve was gazetted on 21 December 1923, has a size of 6.87 square kilometres (2.65 mi^{2}), and is also located within the Avon Wheatbelt bioregion.
