= Broomehill East, Western Australia =

Locality in the Shire of Broomehill-Tambellup, Western Australia

Broomehill East
- other
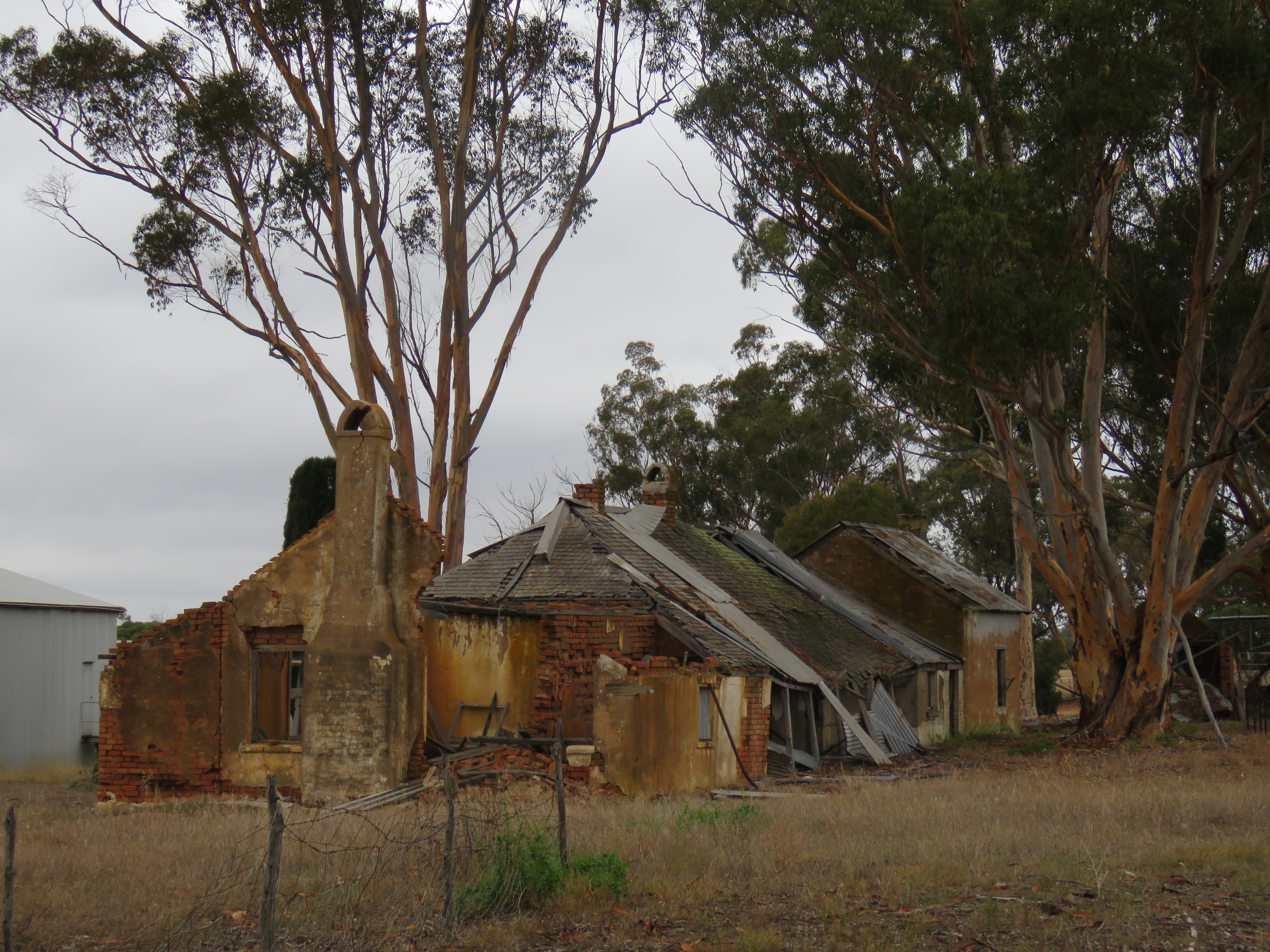
- Ruins of the state heritage listed Martinup homestead

- Coordinates: 33.87611°S 117.76585°E
- Country: Australia
- State: Western Australia
- LGA(s): Shire of Broomehill–Tambellup
- Location: 276 km (171 mi) SE of Perth; 128 km (80 mi) N of Albany; 26 km (16 mi) SE of Katanning

Government
  - State electorate(s): Roe
  - Federal division(s): O'Connor

Area
  - Total: 536.7 km^{2} (207.2 sq mi)

Population
  - Total(s): 109 (SAL 2021)
- Postcode: 6318
Localities around Broomehill East
Murdong	Ewlyamartup	Coyrecup
Broomehill West	Broomehill East	Pallinup
Bobalong	Dartnall	Pallinup

Broomehill East is a rural locality of the Shire of Broomehill–Tambellup of the Great Southern region of Western Australia, adjacent to the town of Broomehill. The Great Southern Highway and the Great Southern Railway, for the most part, form the western border of the locality. The majority of the gazetted townsite of Peringillup and parts of the Peringillup Nature Reserve are located within Broomehill East.

== History ==
Broomehill East is located on the traditional lands of the Koreng people of the Noongar nation.

The townsite of Peringillup, located in the south-west of Broomehill East and in neighbouring Broomehill West, was established in 1907 as a siding on the Great Southern Railway. The town of Broomehill was established just prior to the completion of this railway in 1889, and gazetted in 1890.

The ruins of the Martinup homestead are located within Broomehill East and are on the Western Australian State Register of Heritage Places. The area of the future homestead, centred around Martinup spring, was historically a Noongar campsite, to which Edward Treasure, an early European settler, was taken in the 1860s. Treasure settled in the area and had Martinup constructed between 1860 and 1863. The property remained in the procession of his descendants until 1984, except for a period from 1904 to 1921.

== Horsepower Highway ==
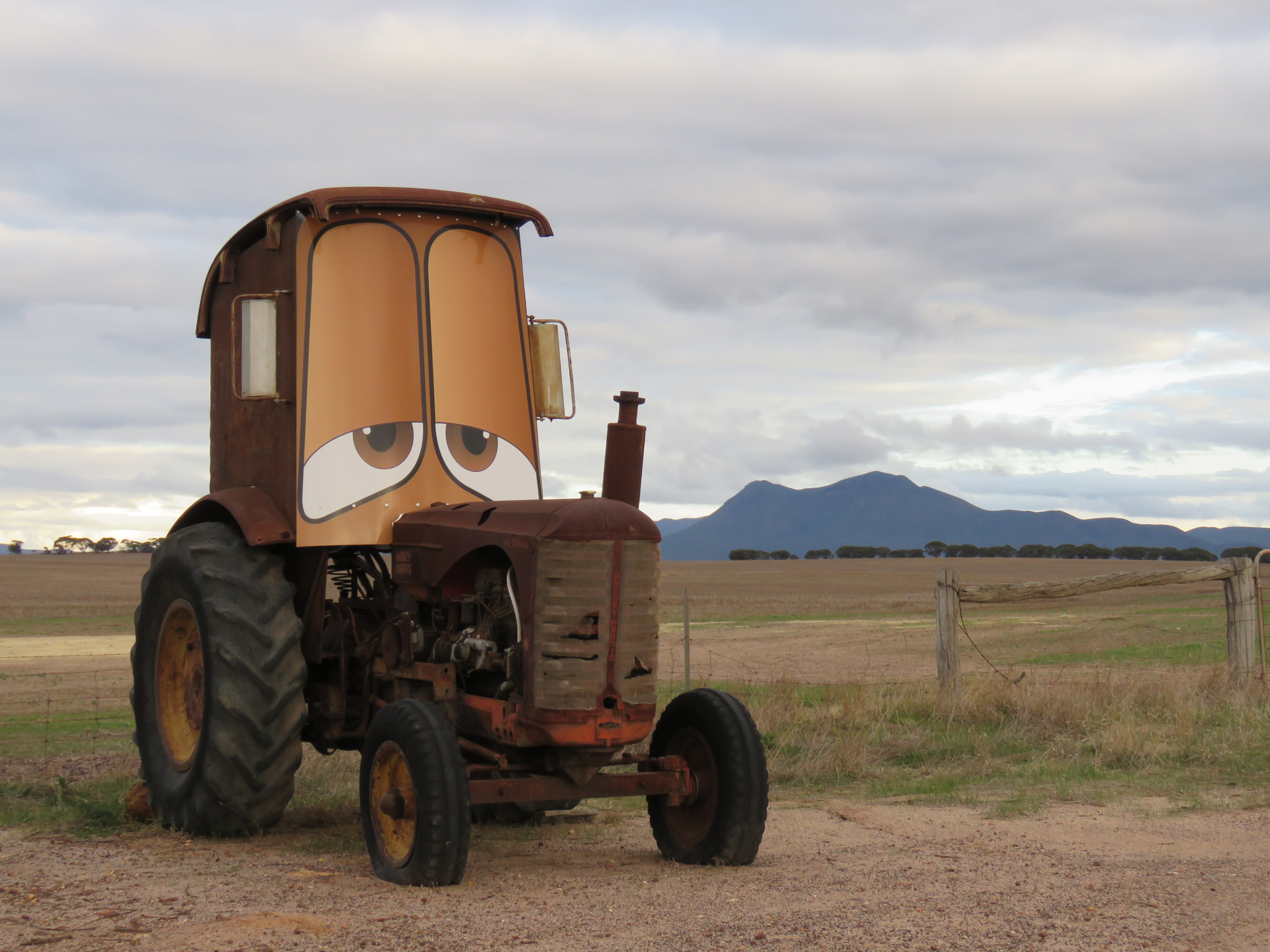
"DIESEL", a "country cow" on the Horsepower Highway, with the Stirling Range in the background

The Horsepower Highway, which originates in Broomehill and passes through the locality and on to the neighbouring Shire of Gnowangerup, is a 75-kilometre (47 mi) long tourist route. It displays vintage tractors and other artworks and finishes at the border of Stirling Range National Park.

== Nature reserve ==
The Peringillup Nature Reserve was gazetted on 12 October 1979, has a size of 2.18 square kilometres (0.84 sq mi), and is located within the Avon Wheatbelt bioregion.
