= Murdong, Western Australia =

Locality in the Shire of Katanning, Western Australia

Murdong
- other
- Coordinates: 33.74250°S 117.57690°E
- Country: Australia
- State: Western Australia
- LGA(s): Shire of Katanning
- Location: 258 km (160 mi) SE of Perth; 144 km (89 mi) N of Albany; 8 km (5.0 mi) S of Katanning

Government
  - State electorate(s): Roe
  - Federal division(s): O'Connor

Area
  - Total: 78 km^{2} (30 sq mi)

Population
  - Total(s): 24 (SAL 2021)
- Postcode: 6317
Localities around Murdong
Carrolup	Katanning	Ewlyamartup
Carrolup	Murdong	Ewlyamartup
Broomehill West	Broomehill West	Broomehill East

Murdong is a rural locality of the Shire of Katanning in the Great Southern region of Western Australia. The Great Southern Highway and the Great Southern Railway run through the locality from north to south.

Murdong spans the traditional land of the Koreng and Kaneang peoples, both of the Noongar nation.

Murdong was a siding on the Great Southern Railway, operational from 1904 to 2000.
