= Bobalong, Western Australia =

Locality in the Shire of Broomehill-Tambellup, Western Australia

Bobalong
- other
- Coordinates: 34.00741°S 117.56434°E
- Country: Australia
- State: Western Australia
- LGA(s): Shire of Broomehill–Tambellup
- Location: 282 km (175 mi) SE of Perth; 115 km (71 mi) N of Albany; 36 km (22 mi) S of Katanning

Government
  - State electorate(s): Roe
  - Federal division(s): O'Connor

Area
  - Total: 169.2 km^{2} (65.3 sq mi)

Population
  - Total(s): 45 (SAL 2021)
- Postcode: 6320
Localities around Bobalong
Broomehill West	Broomehill West	Broomehill East
Borderdale	Bobalong	Dartnall
Borderdale	Moonies Hill	Tambellup

Bobalong is a rural locality of the Shire of Broomehill–Tambellup in the Great Southern region of Western Australia. The Great Southern Highway, the Great Southern Railway and the Gordon River all run through the locality from north to south.

Bobalong is located on the traditional land of the Kaniyang people of the Noongar nation.

The heritage listed Bobalong School site is located within Bobalong.
