= Pootenup, Western Australia =

Town in Western Australia

Pootenup
- Town
- Interactive map of Pootenup
- Coordinates: 34.235969°S 117.649600°E
- Country: Australia
- State: Western Australia
- LGA: Shire of Broomehill–Tambellup Shire of Cranbrook
- Location: 304 km (189 mi) SW of Perth; 44 km (27 mi) S of Broomehill; 11 km (6.8 mi) NE of Cranbrook

Government
  - State electorate: Roe
  - Federal division: O'Connor

Area
  - Total: 0.94 km^{2} (0.36 sq mi)
- Postcode: 6320 6321
- Gazetted: 1908

Pootenup is a townsite in the Great Southern region of Western Australia. Pootenup is located in both the Shire of Cranbrook and the Shire of Broomehill-Tambellup. The Great Southern Highway forms the shire boundary in this area and the area of the townsite of Pootenup spans either side of the highway. Because of its location across two shires, Tunney has two postcodes, 6320 for the eastern part, located in Broomehill-Tambellup, and 6321 for the western part, located in Cranbrook. Parts of the gazetted area of the former townsite is now covered by the Pootenup Nature Reserve.

== History ==
Pootenup was established as a stop on the Great Southern Railway when the railway line opened in 1889. Demand for land in the area led to the decision to establish a townsite in Pootenup in 1907, which was gazetted the following year. The name Pootenup is of Aboriginal origin and was first recorded in 1851 but its meaning is not known. The site of the railway siding at Pootenup is on the Shire of Broomehill-Tambellup heritage list.

A 1940 article in the Western Mail described the area around Pootenup as "a rich farming district in the vicinity of the Stirling Ranges" and "greatly favoured by sportsmen during the wild duck season" because of the lakes surrounding the town.

== Nature reserve ==
The Pootenup Nature Reserve was gazetted on 27 May 1983, has a size of 0.47 square kilometres (0.18 sq mi), and is located within the Avon Wheatbelt bioregion. The reserve is exclusively located in the Shire of Cranbrook part of the townsite.
