= Peringillup, Western Australia =

Town in Western Australia

Peringillup
- Town
- Interactive map of Peringillup
- Coordinates: 33.93594°S 117.64680°E
- Country: Australia
- State: Western Australia
- LGA: Shire of Broomehill–Tambellup
- Location: 276 km (171 mi) SW of Perth; 10 km (6.2 mi) S of Broomehill; 12 km (7.5 mi) N of Tambellup

Government
  - State electorate: Roe
  - Federal division: O'Connor

Area
  - Total: 0.05 km^{2} (0.019 sq mi)
- Postcode: 6318
- Gazetted: 1914

Peringillup is an abandoned townsite in the Shire of Broomehill-Tambellup of the Great Southern region of Western Australia. Peringillup is located on the Great Southern Highway. The gazetted area of the town is not contiguous. While the majority of it is located east of the Great Southern Highway, a small exclave is to the west of the highway, south-west of the main area of Peringillup. All of the gazetted area of the former townsite is now covered by the Peringillup Nature Reserve.

With a size of 0.05 square kilometres (0.019 sq mi), it is one of the smallest gazetted townsites in Western Australia.

== History ==
Peringillup was established in 1907 as a siding on the Great Southern Railway, which originally had opened in 1889. It was originally known as Wudara. The decision was made to establish a townsite at Peringillup in 1911, and it was gazetted in 1914. The name originates from the near-by Perringillup Well and is of Aboriginal origin. It was first recorded in 1878 but its meaning is not known.

== Nature reserve ==
The Peringillup Nature Reserve was gazetted on 12 October 1979, has a size of 2.18 square kilometres (0.84 sq mi), and is located within the Avon Wheatbelt bioregion.
