= Borderdale, Western Australia =

Locality in the Shire of Broomehill-Tambellup, Western Australia

Borderdale
- other
- Coordinates: 34.05212°S 117.39850°E
- Country: Australia
- State: Western Australia
- LGA(s): Shire of Broomehill–Tambellup
- Location: 274 km (170 mi) SE of Perth; 118 km (73 mi) N of Albany; 40 km (25 mi) SW of Katanning

Government
  - State electorate(s): Roe
  - Federal division(s): O'Connor

Area
  - Total: 146 km^{2} (56 sq mi)

Population
  - Total(s): 29 (SAL 2021)
- Postcode: 6320
Localities around Borderdale
Lumeah	Broomehill West	Broomehill West
Lumeah	Borderdale	Bobalong
Cranbrook	Cranbrook	Moonies Hill

Borderdale is a rural locality of the Shire of Broomehill–Tambellup in the Great Southern region of Western Australia. The Albany Highway forms the south-western border of the locality. The eastern part of the gazetted townsite of Tunney is located in Borderdale, while the western part is located in Cranbrook, with the Albany Highway forming the border.

Borderdale is located on the traditional land of the Kaniyang people of the Noongar nation.

The historic townsite of Tunney was gazetted in 1912, but the area is now forested, with no buildings.
