= Moonies Hill, Western Australia =

Locality in the Shire of Broomehill-Tambellup, Western Australia

Moonies Hill
- other
- Coordinates: 34.10989°S 117.56480°E
- Country: Australia
- State: Western Australia
- LGA(s): Shire of Broomehill–Tambellup
- Location: 287 km (178 mi) SE of Perth; 105 km (65 mi) N of Albany; 47 km (29 mi) S of Katanning

Government
  - State electorate(s): Roe
  - Federal division(s): O'Connor

Area
  - Total: 187.7 km^{2} (72.5 sq mi)

Population
  - Total(s): 25 (SAL 2021)
- Postcode: 6320
Localities around Moonies Hill
Bobalong	Bobalong	Tambellup
Borderdale	Moonies Hill	Wansbrough
Cranbrook	Cranbrook	Wansbrough

Moonies Hill is a rural locality of the Shire of Broomehill–Tambellup in the Great Southern region of Western Australia. The Gordon River forms the south-eastern border of the locality. In the north-east, it borders the townsite of Tambellup.

Moonies Hill is located on the traditional land of the Kaniyang people of the Noongar nation.

The heritage listed Moonies Hill School site and Moreton Bay Fig Tree are located within Moonies Hill.
