= Dartnall, Western Australia =

Locality in the Shire of Broomehill-Tambellup, Western Australia

Dartnall
- other
- Coordinates: 34.02934°S 117.75180°E
- Country: Australia
- State: Western Australia
- LGA(s): Shire of Broomehill–Tambellup
- Location: 291 km (181 mi) SE of Perth; 110 km (68 mi) N of Albany; 43 km (27 mi) S of Katanning

Government
  - State electorate(s): Roe
  - Federal division(s): O'Connor

Area
  - Total: 156.2 km^{2} (60.3 sq mi)

Population
  - Total(s): 33 (SAL 2021)
- Postcode: 6320
Localities around Dartnall
Bobalong	Broomehill East	Broomehill East
Tambellup	Dartnall	Pallinup
Wansbrough	Lake Toolbrunup	Lake Toolbrunup

Dartnall is a rural locality of the Shire of Broomehill–Tambellup in the Great Southern region of Western Australia. The Great Southern Highway and the Great Southern Railway form the far western border of the locality.

Dartnall is located on the traditional lands of the Koreng people of the Noongar nation.

Dartnall was a siding on the Tambellup to Ongerup railway line, the siding opening in 1912 and closing in 1967. The railway line run through the locality from west to east. The site of the Dartnall railway siding is now on the shire's heritage list. In 1920, land around the Dartnall siding was also reserved for a potential townsite.
