= Wansbrough =

Wansbrough may refer to:

- Arthur Wansbrough (1877–1949), Australian politician
- Charles Wansbrough (1875–1939), Australian politician
- Henry Wansbrough, British biblical scholar and monk of Ampleforth
- John Wansbrough (1928–2002), American historian, working at SOAS, specialising in Islamic origins
- Owen Wansbrough-Jones (1906–1983), British academic chemist and soldier

== Places ==
- Wansbrough, Western Australia, a locality of the Shire of Broomehill–Tambellup
