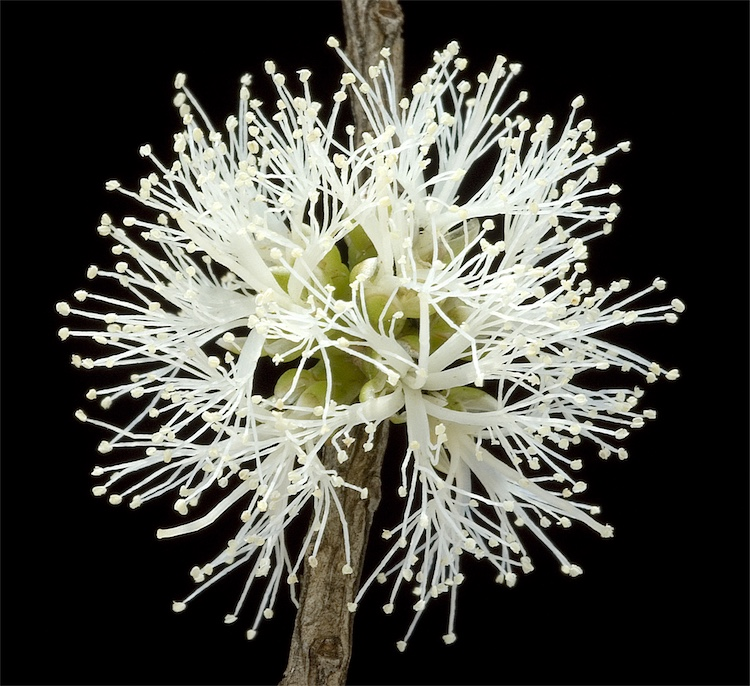

Scientific classification
- Kingdom: Plantae
- Clade: Embryophytes
- Clade: Tracheophytes
- Clade: Spermatophytes
- Clade: Angiosperms
- Clade: Eudicots
- Clade: Rosids
- Order: Myrtales
- Family: Myrtaceae
- Genus: Melaleuca
- Species: M. undulata

Binomial name
- Melaleuca undulata Benth.

Synonyms
- Melaleuca undulata var. minor Benth.; Myrtoleucodendron undulatum (Benth.) Kuntze

= Melaleuca undulata =

Hidden honey-myrtle

Shrub in the myrtle family endemic to the south of Western Australia

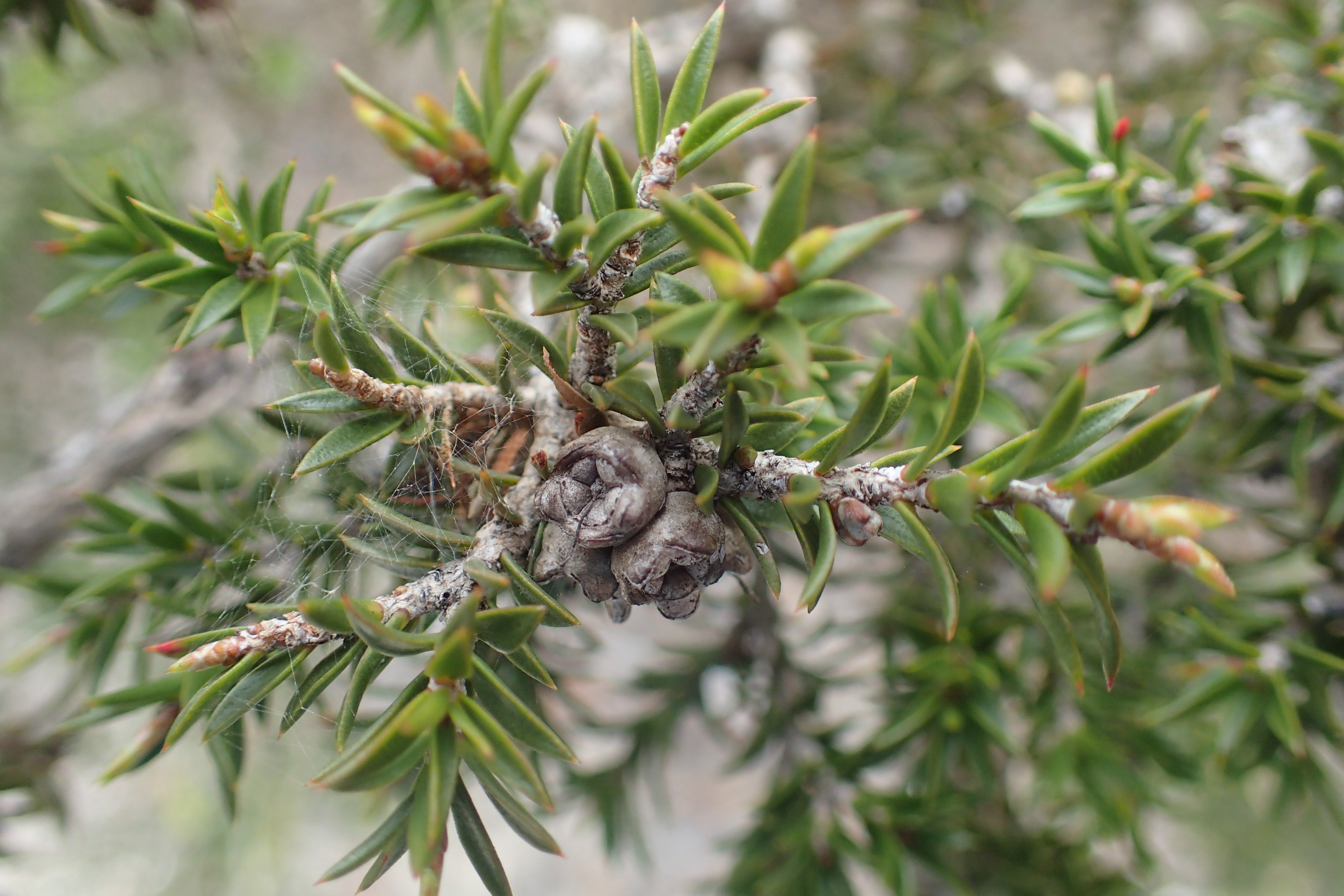
Foliage and fruit

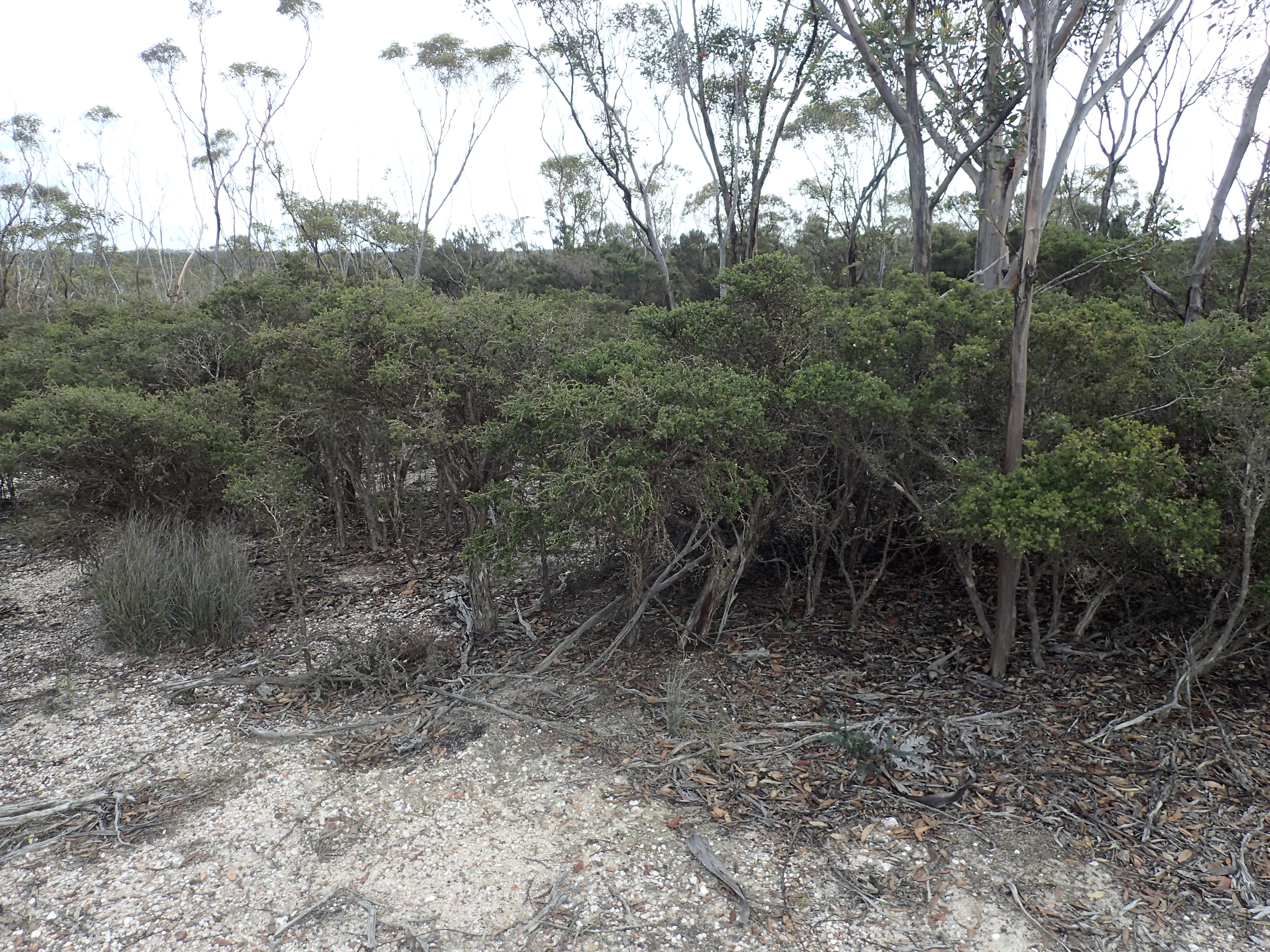
Habit about 21km south of Ravensthorpe

Melaleuca undulata, commonly known as hidden honey-myrtle is a shrub in the myrtle family Myrtaceae and is endemic to the south of Western Australia. It is a spreading, moderately dense, perennial, woody shrub with creamy-white flowers in small clusters.

== Description ==
Melaleuca undulata grows to a height of about 0.3–2 m (1–7 ft) spreading to 2 m (7 ft) or more. Its leaves are arranged alternately, mostly lance-shaped to oval, 3–15 mm (0.1–0.6 in) long and 1.5–4 mm (0.06–0.2 in) wide and slightly hairy.

The flowers are arranged in heads up to 27 mm (1 in) in diameter scattered along the branches, with 1 to 18 flowers in each head. The flowers mainly appear from October to March and are white to cream. The stamens are arranged in bundles of five around the flower, with 8 to 30 stamens in each bundle. The base of the flower is glabrous and 1.2–2.5 mm (0.05–0.1 in) long. The woody capsules are 2.5–4 mm (0.1–0.2 in) long.

== Taxonomy and naming ==
Melaleuca undulata was first formally described in 1867 by George Bentham in Flora Australiensis. The specific epithet (undulata) is derived from the Latin undulatus meaning "wavy" "in reference to the leaf blade being wavy".

== Distribution and habitat ==
This melaleuca occurs from the Stirling Range – Broomehill district eastwards to the Israelite Bay district. It grows in mallee and heath, swampy areas, river beds and the edge of clay pans in sand, clay or lateritic gravel.

== Conservation ==
Melaleuca undulata is classified as not threatened by the Government of Western Australia Department of Parks and Wildlife.

== Use in horticulture ==
This is a hardy species suitable as a low, informal, prickly hedge. It will grow in most soils and aspects.
