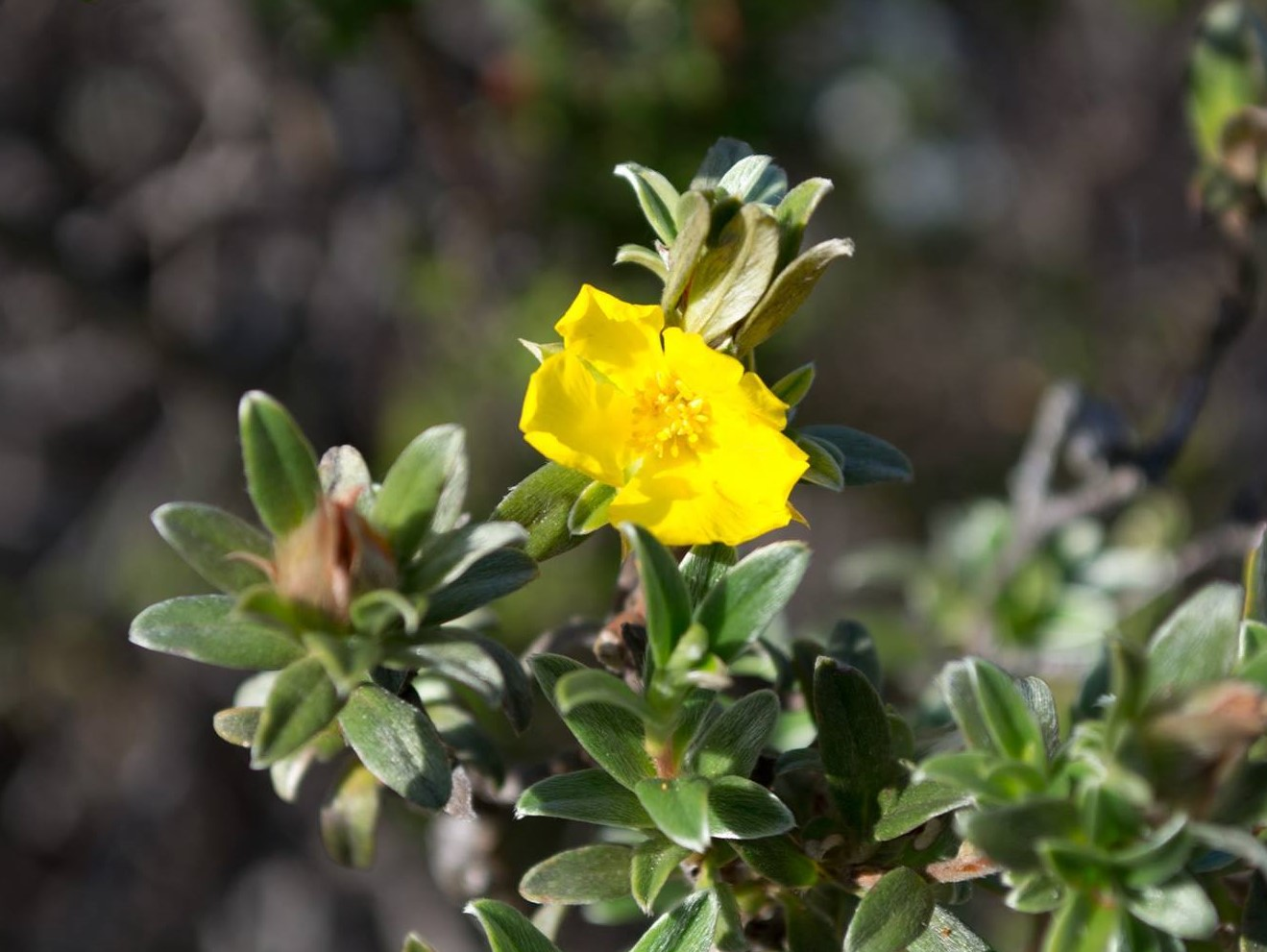

Conservation status
- Priority Three — Poorly Known Taxa (DEC)

Scientific classification
- Kingdom: Plantae
- Clade: Tracheophytes
- Clade: Angiosperms
- Clade: Eudicots
- Order: Dilleniales
- Family: Dilleniaceae
- Genus: Hibbertia
- Species: H. argentea

Binomial name
- Hibbertia argentea Steud.

= Hibbertia argentea =

Silver leaved guinea flower

Species of flowering plant

Hibbertia argentea, commonly known as silver leaved guinea flower, is a species of flowering plant in the family Dilleniaceae and is endemic to Western Australia. It is an erect shrub that typically grows to a height of 0.3–1.2 m (1 ft 0 in – 3 ft 11 in) and has yellow flowers from September to December. The species was first formally described in 1845 by Ernst Gottlieb von Steudel in Lehmann's Plantae Preissianae. The specific epithet (argentea) means "silvery", referring to the colour of the leaves.

The species has a limited distribution through the Great Southern region of Western Australia between Cranbrook in the north, Gnowangerup in the east, and Albany in the south and west. It is found on granite hills and rocky outcrops growing in clay-sand or rocky loam soils.

Hibbertia argentea is classified as "Priority Three" by the Government of Western Australia Department of Parks and Wildlife meaning that it is poorly known and known from only a few locations but is not under imminent threat.

== See also ==
- List of Hibbertia species
