= Katanning Mosque =

Mosque in Katanning, Western Australia

- Location within Western Australia

Religion
- Affiliation: Islam
- Status: Active

Location
- Location: 18 Warren Road, Katanning, Western Australia
- Country: Australia
- Coordinates: 33°40′54″S 117°33′19″E

Architecture
- Type: mosque
- Established: 1980

Specifications
- Dome: One
- Minaret: Two

The Katanning Mosque is a mosque in Katanning, Western Australia.

== History ==
The mosque was opened in 1980 after it was built by the local Islamic community who arrived in Katanning in 1974 from Christmas Island and Cocos Islands. In 1981 it was visited and formally opened by former Malaysian Prime Minister Tunku Abdul Rahman.

The Australian media has, at various times, shown interest in the community and mosque, to portray an understanding of an Islamic community located in a remote Australian rural town.

== Architecture ==
The mosque was constructed with orange bricks and silver minarets.

== See also ==
- Islam in Australia
- List of mosques in Australia
