= Gordon River (Western Australia) =

River in Western Australia

Gordon
- Location of the river mouth in Western Australia
- Etymology: George Hamilton Gordon, the 4th Earl of Aberdeen

Location
- Country: Australia
- State: Western Australia
- Region: Great Southern

Physical characteristics
- Source: Three Wells
  - location: near Broomehill
  - elevation: 344 m (1,129 ft)
- Mouth: confluence with the Frankland River
  - location: north of Frankland River (town)
  - coordinates: 34°12′35″S 117°0′2″E
  - elevation: 207 m (679 ft)
- Length: 121 km (75 mi)
- Basin size: 4,652 km^{2} (1,796 sq mi)

Basin features
- River system: Frankland River

The Gordon River is a river in the Great Southern region of Western Australia.

== Location and features ==
The headwaters of the river rise below Three Wells near Broomehill. The river flows in a south-westerly direction parallel with the Great Southern Highway as far as Tambellup then veers westward and crosses Albany Highway north of Cranbrook and discharges into the Frankland River of which it is a tributary.

The river flows through a number of pools during its journey, including Balbalingup Pool, Balingup Pool, Boyacup Pool and Poolyup Pool.

The river has four tributaries: Wadjekanup River, Cowenup Brook, Slab Hut Gully and Uannup Brook.

The river was named in 1835 by Surveyor General John Septimus Roe during an expedition from Perth to Albany. The river is named after George Hamilton Gordon, the 4th Earl of Aberdeen, who later became the prime minister of the United Kingdom.

== See also ==
- List of rivers of Australia § Western Australia
