= Tunney, Western Australia =

Locality in Western Australia

Tunney
- Town
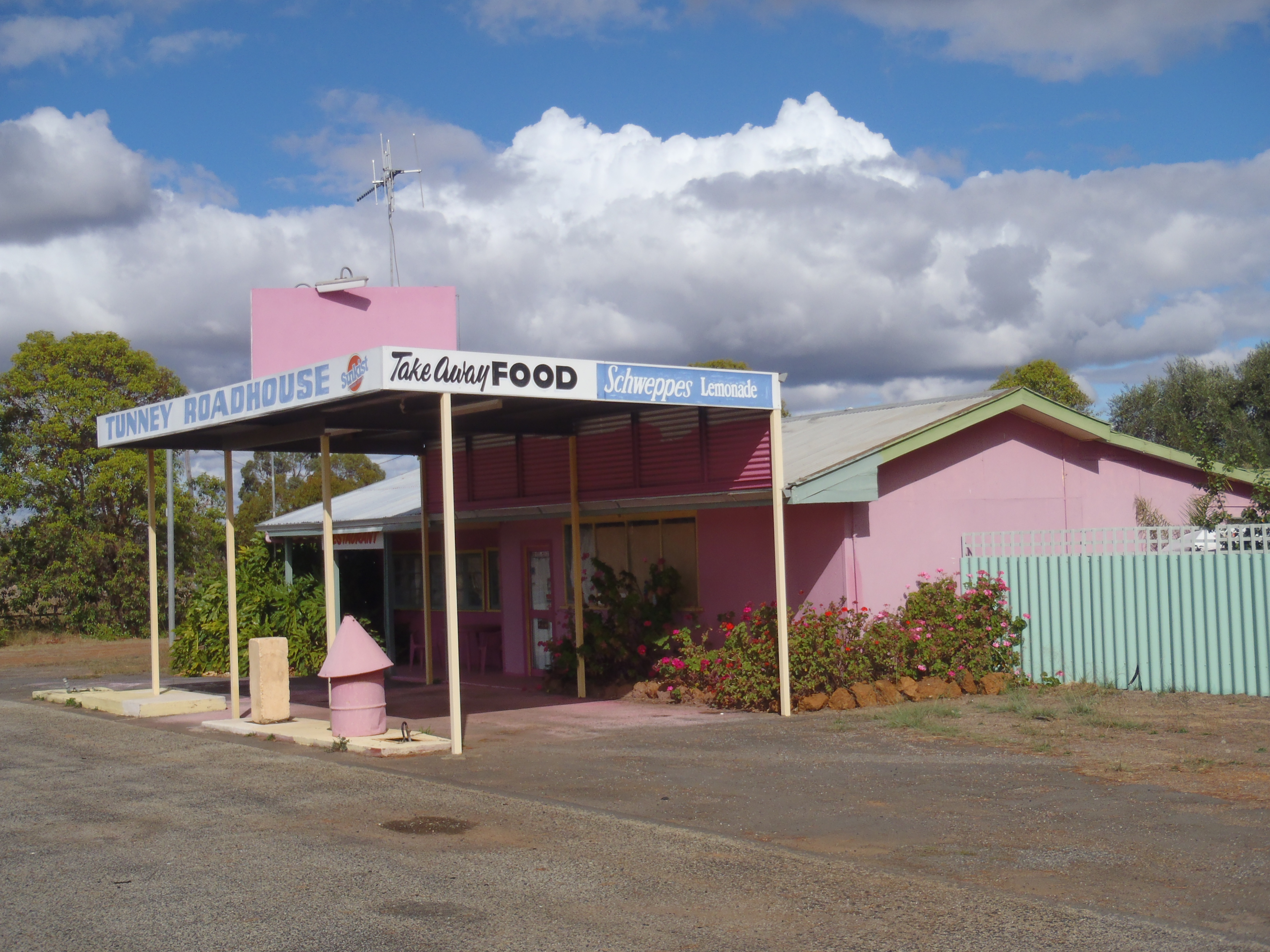
- Tunney Roadhouse

- Interactive map of Tunney
- Coordinates: 34.117°S 117.367°E
- Country: Australia
- State: Western Australia
- LGA: Shire of Broomehill-Tambellup–Shire of Cranbrook
- Location: 296 km (184 mi) SSE of Perth; 27 km (17 mi) NW of Cranbrook
- Established: 1912

Government
  - State electorate: Roe
  - Federal division: O'Connor

Area
  - Total: 1.4 km^{2} (0.54 sq mi)
- Elevation: 257 m (843 ft)
- Postcode: 6320–6321

Tunney is a gazetted townsite located along the Albany Highway between Kojonup and Cranbrook, in the Shire of Cranbrook and Shire of Broomehill-Tambellup in the Great Southern region of Western Australia. The Albany Highway forms the shire boundary in this area and the area of the townsite of Tunney spans either side of the highway. Because of its location across two shires, Tunney has two postcodes, 6320 for the eastern part, located in Broomehill-Tambellup, and 6321 for the western part, located in Cranbrook.

The district was first settled in the 1850s, and by 1909 a new settler named J. A. Atcheson wrote to the government asking for assistance with establishing a school and other facilities, and for a townsite to be declared. Following inspection some land near Slab Hut Gully (which is why the place was also known as Slab Hut) was set aside for a townsite, which was locally known as Paul Valley. Lots were surveyed in 1910, and the Aboriginal name of Tulungup (from Teulungup) was proposed, but rejected by the Minister of Lands. The local residents then unanimously supported the name Tunney. The Minister of Lands then chose the name Nymbupp, but after stiff opposition from the locals eventually Tunney was used. The townsite was gazetted in 1912.

The name Tunney comes from the oldest local resident in the area at the time, James Tunney, who owned lands around the area in the 1880s. He was the son of Sergeant John Tunney who was an enrolled Pensioner Guard and had settled in the area in the 1860s.

An agricultural hall was opened in the town in 1913 by A. E. Piesse, in front of a large crowd, including Tunney. Tunney was presented with a set of pipes and his wife received a tea service from Piesse in recognition of all their contributions to the community, including the use of their house for town meetings.

The roadhouse was destroyed by fire on 28 May 2017.
