= Tambellup, Western Australia =

Tambellup
- Town
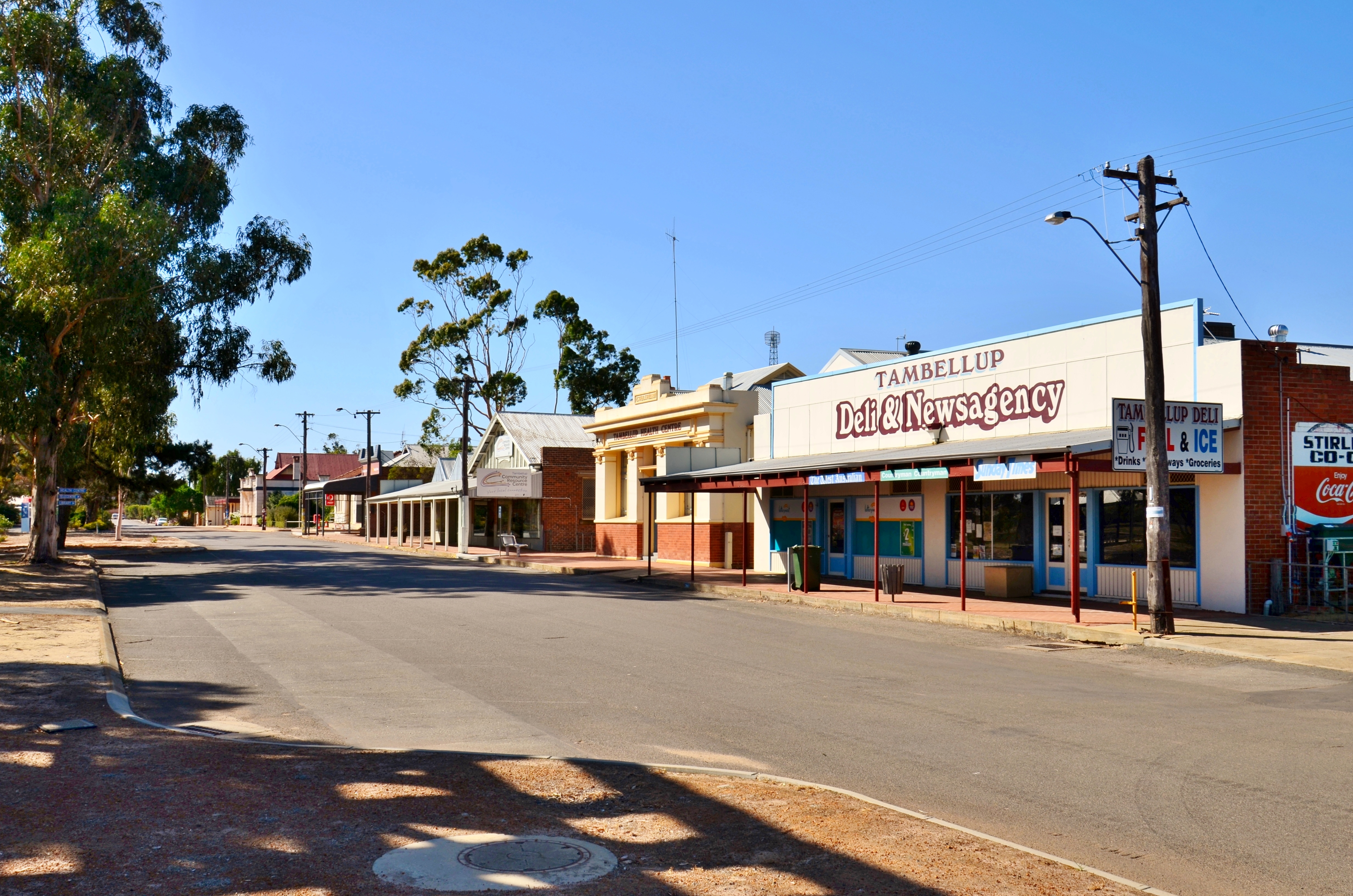
- Norrish Street, Tambellup in 2018

- Interactive map of Tambellup
- Coordinates: 34°02′00″S 117°39′00″E
- Country: Australia
- State: Western Australia
- LGA: Shire of Broomehill-Tambellup
- Location: 290 km (180 mi) south east of Perth; 40 km (25 mi) south of Katanning; 36 km (22 mi) west of Gnowangerup
- Established: 1899

Government
  - State electorate: Roe
  - Federal division: O'Connor

Area
  - Total: 5.4 km^{2} (2.1 sq mi)
- Elevation: 269 m (883 ft)

Population
  - Total: 281 (SAL 2021)
- Postcode: 6320
Localities around Tambellup
Bobalong	Bobalong	Bobalong
Bobalong	Tambellup	Bobalong
Moonies Hill	Wansbrough	Dartnall

The townsite of Tambellup is located in the Great Southern region of Western Australia, 317 km south-east of Perth on the Great Southern Highway where it crosses the Gordon River. It is 23 km south of Broomehill.

The area around Tambellup was first settled by pastoralists in the late 1840s, and in 1849 the Surveyor General, John Septimus Roe, when passing through the area, referred to Morrison's south west station at "Tambul-yillup". The area was later settled by the Norrish family, and the spelling commonly used for the place then was "Tambellelup". When the Great Southern railway line was opened in 1889 a station was established at Tambellup, and it appears that the shortened version of the name was created by the railway, as the timetable in 1889 uses the "Tambellup" spelling. Tambellup was gazetted a townsite in 1899. The meaning of this Aboriginal name is not known, although one source gives it as "place of thunder" (from Toombellanup). Another explanation is that Tambellup means "the place of many Tammars", Tammar being the Noongar word for a small marsupial that used to frequent the area.

Tambellup's main street is Norrish Street, named after its first European settler, Josiah Norrish (1841-1884), who in 1872 was attracted to the area by its large stands of Santalum spicatum (commonly known as sandalwood). Today, the main industry in Tambellup is sheep farming, while sandalwood continues as a distant second. Much of the sandalwood is exported, and used in the manufacture of joss sticks.

The Gordon River has flooded several times since Tambellup was established. The first recorded flood was in 1913, then again in 1937, then a major flood in 1955 when the river rose 6 metres (20 ft) resulting in some parts of the town being 1 metre (3 ft) underwater.

In January 1982, a decaying tropical cyclone passed over the catchment area feeding the Gordon River causing it to flood the town. Much of the town, including the main street, was covered to a depth of about 1 metre (3 ft).

The surrounding areas produce wheat and other cereal crops. The town is a receival site for the CBH Group.
