= Cranbrook, Western Australia =

Cranbrook Twonkup or Dwangup (Nyungar)
- Town
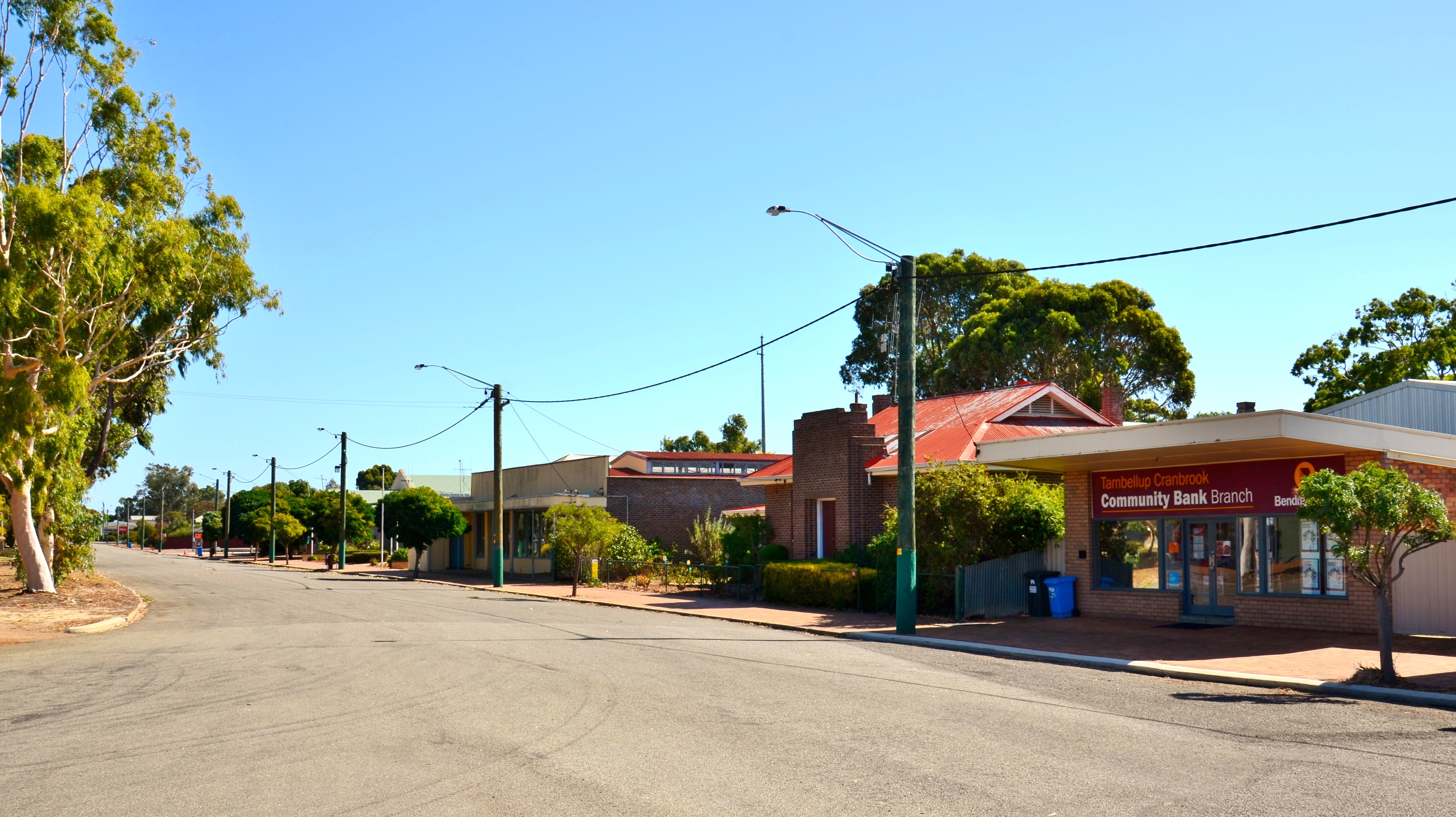
- Gathorne Street, Cranbrook, 2018

- Interactive map of Cranbrook
- Coordinates: 34.30°S 117.55°E
- Country: Australia
- State: Western Australia
- LGA: Shire of Cranbrook
- Location: 323 km (201 mi) SSE of Perth; 93 km (58 mi) N of Albany; 80 km (50 mi) S of Katanning
- Established: 1889

Government
  - State electorate: Roe
  - Federal division: O'Connor

Area
  - Total: 1,206.7 km^{2} (465.9 sq mi)
- Elevation: 258 m (846 ft)

Population
  - Total: 288 (UCL 2021)
- Postcode: 6321

Cranbrook is a small town in the Shire of Cranbrook in the Great Southern region of Western Australia between Katanning, Kojonup and Mount Barker, situated 320 km south of Perth. It is billed as "The Gateway to the Stirlings", referring to the nearby Stirling Range National Park. At the 2006 census, Cranbrook had a population of 280.

The settlement grew after it was one of the original railway stations on the Great Southern Railway when the railway opened in 1889, and was gazetted a townsite in 1899.

In 1926, through the Boyup Brook-Cranbrook Railway Act 1926, a railway connection from the Donnybrook–Katanning railway to the Great Southern Railway was approved, which would have connected Cranbrook to Boyup Brook by rail. Construction of this line was started but never completed. The name is taken from the town of Cranbrook in Kent, England, about 65 kilometres south east of London. It is believed to have been named by Mr J A Wright, who was manager of the Western Australian Land Company which built the railway.

The Noongar peoples know the area as Twonkup or Dwangup; it was a traditional meeting place of the Menang peoples from the south, the Goreng from the south east and the Kaneang from the south west. It was also an important law ground and burial ground with over forty burial mounds found around the area.

The town is a Cooperative Bulk Handling receival site.

Two other gazetted townsites are located within the locality of Cranbrook, Pootenup and Tunney. Both are at the eastern border of the locality and shire and the area of the gazetted townsites stretches into the neighbouring Shire of Broomehill-Tambellup.
