= Shire of Broomehill–Tambellup =

Coordinates: 34°02′28″S 117°38′31″E

Shire of Broomehill-Tambellup
- Local government area
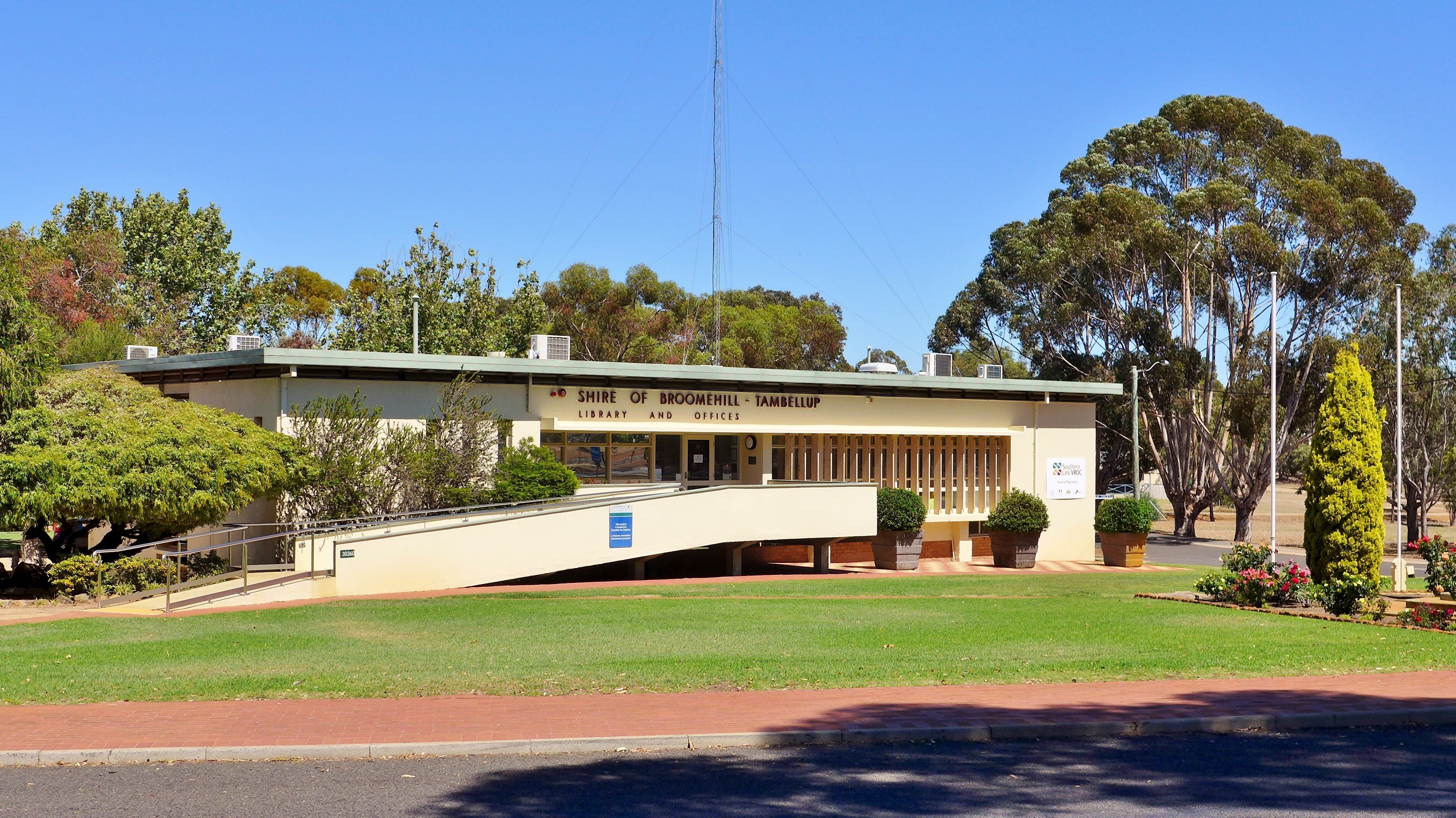
- Broomehill library and shire offices, 2018

- Interactive map of Shire of Broomehill-Tambellup
- Country: Australia
- State: Western Australia
- Region: Great Southern
- Established: 2008
- Council seat: Tambellup

Government
  - Shire President: Doug Barritt
  - State electorate: Roe
  - Federal division: O'Connor

Area
  - Total: 2,609.1 km^{2} (1,007.4 sq mi)

Population
  - Total: 1,046 (LGA 2021)
  - Density: 0.4/km^{2} (1.0/sq mi)
- Website: Shire of Broomehill-Tambellup
LGAs around Shire of Broomehill-Tambellup
Katanning	Katanning	Kent
Kojonup	Shire of Broomehill-Tambellup	Gnowangerup
Cranbrook	Cranbrook	Gnowangerup

The Shire of Broomehill-Tambellup is a local government area in the Great Southern region of Western Australia, 320 kilometres (200 mi) south-southeast of the state capital, Perth. The Shire covers an area of 2,609.1 square kilometres (1,007.4 sq mi), and its seat of government is the town of Tambellup. It came into existence in 2008 through the amalgamation of the former Shire of Broomehill and Shire of Tambellup.

== History ==
=== Shire of Broomehill ===
The Broomehill Road Board was gazetted on 19 May 1892. On 1 July 1961, it became a shire following changes to the Local Government Act.

=== Shire of Tambellup ===
The Tambellup Road Board was gazetted in 1905 upon a petition by local residents to separate from the Broomehill Road District. On 1 July 1961, it became a shire following changes to the Local Government Act.

=== Amalgamation ===
On 3 September 2007, the Local Government Advisory Board confirmed that the Shires of Broomehill and Tambellup were looking to merge. A proposal put forward by the Shire of Katanning to absorb Woodanilling, Broomehill and Tambellup was rejected by the other councils. A six-week public submission period was conducted in November and December 2007.

On 8 February 2008, the two Shires held a combined special meeting and resolved to recommend to the Board, who had originally proposed a system without wards, that the new Shire have two wards—North Ward, with four councillors, representing Broomehill, and South Ward, with five councillors, representing Tambellup. The Minister accepted the proposal on 17 April 2008, and the Broomehill-Tambellup District Order 2008 was approved by the Governor in Council on 27 May 2008.

The councillors of both local government authorities resigned at the end of June 2008, and elections for the new local government took place on 18 October 2008.

== Indigenous people ==
The west of the Shire of Broomehill–Tambellup is located on the traditional land of the Kaniyang people of the Noongar nation, while the east of the shire is located on the traditional lands of the Koreng people, also of the Noongar nation.

== Wards ==
The Shire is divided into two wards—North Ward, with four councillors, representing Broomehill, and South Ward, with five councillors, representing Tambellup.

== Towns and localities ==
The towns and localities of the Shire of Broomehill-Tambellup with population and size figures based on the most recent Australian census:

Locality	Population	Area	Map
Bobalong	45 (SAL 2021)	169.2 km^{2} (65.3 sq mi)	
Borderdale	29 (SAL 2021)	146 km^{2} (56 sq mi)	
Broomehill Village	211 (SAL 2021)	8.3 km^{2} (3.2 sq mi)	
Broomehill East	109 (SAL 2021)	536.7 km^{2} (207.2 sq mi)	
Broomehill West	173 (SAL 2021)	627.1 km^{2} (242.1 sq mi)	
Dartnall	33 (SAL 2021)	156.2 km^{2} (60.3 sq mi)	
Lake Toolbrunup	76 (SAL 2021)	411.2 km^{2} (158.8 sq mi)	
Moonies Hill	25 (SAL 2021)	187.7 km^{2} (72.5 sq mi)	
Tambellup	281 (SAL 2021)	5.4 km^{2} (2.1 sq mi)	
Wansbrough	60 (SAL 2021)	360.7 km^{2} (139.3 sq mi)	

== Heritage-listed places ==
As of 2023, 215 places are heritage-listed in the Shire of Broomehill-Tambellup, of which five are on the State Register of Heritage Places.
