= Broomehill, Western Australia =

Broomehill
- Town
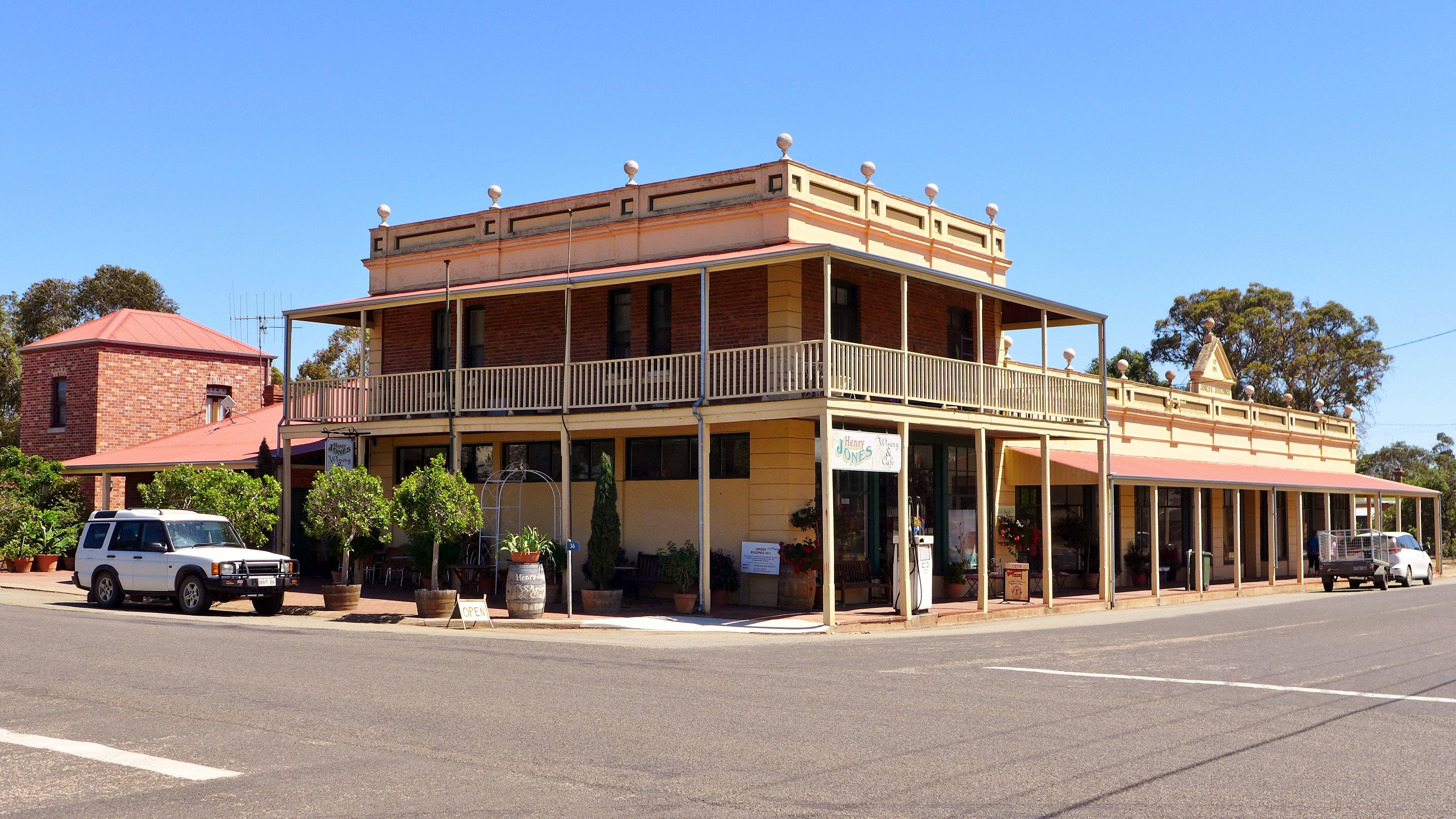
- The Henry Jones Building, Broomehill, 2018

- Interactive map of Broomehill
- Coordinates: 33°50′42″S 117°38′02″E
- Country: Australia
- State: Western Australia
- LGA: Shire of Broomehill-Tambellup
- Location: 302 km (188 mi) south east of Perth; 20 km (12 mi) south of Katanning; 22 km (14 mi) north of Tambellup
- Established: 1890

Government
  - State electorate: Roe
  - Federal division: O'Connor

Area
  - Total: 8.3 km^{2} (3.2 sq mi)
- Elevation: 332 m (1,089 ft)

Population
  - Total: 211 (SAL 2021)
- Postcode: 6318

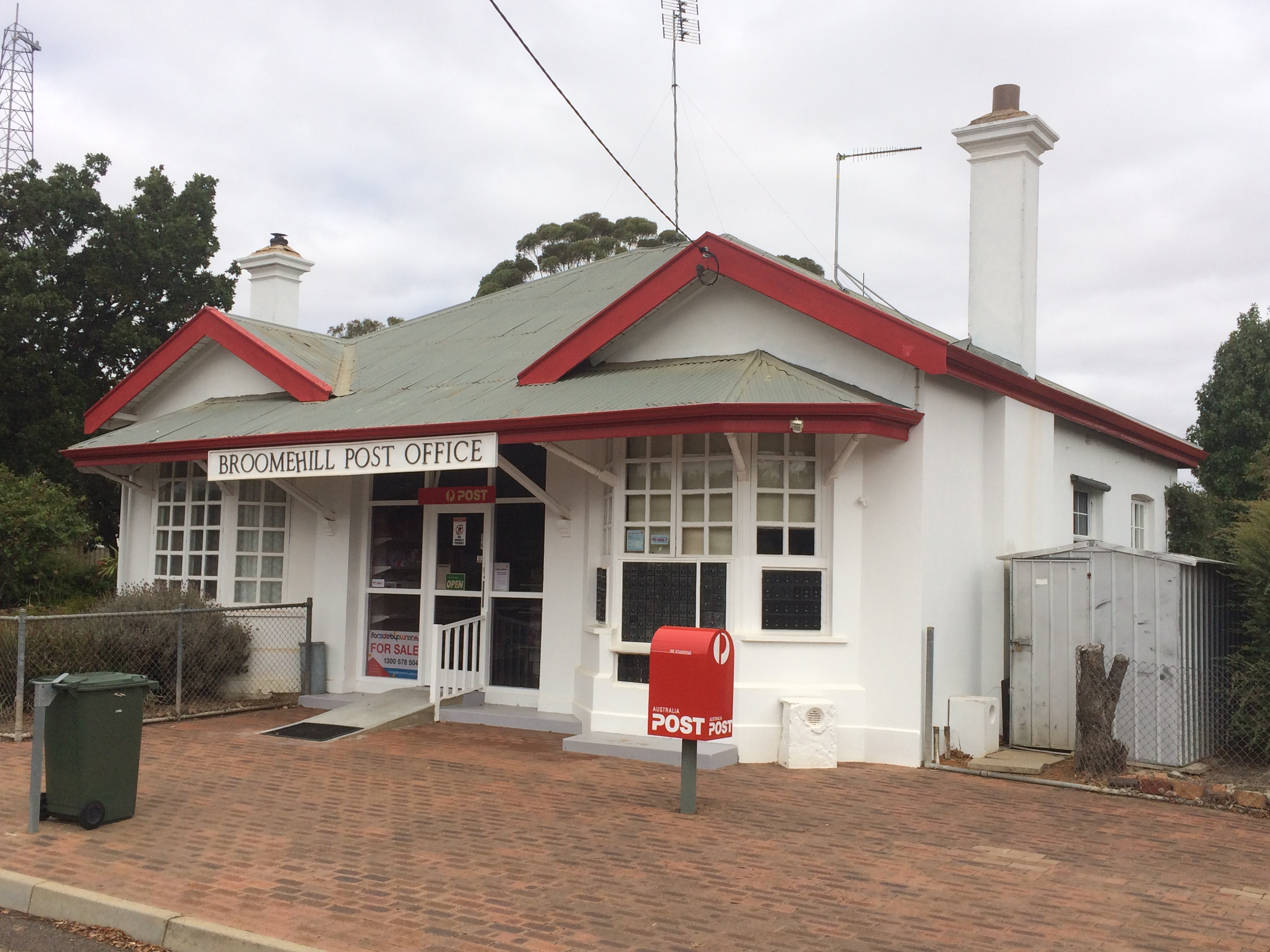
Broomehill Post Office building 2018

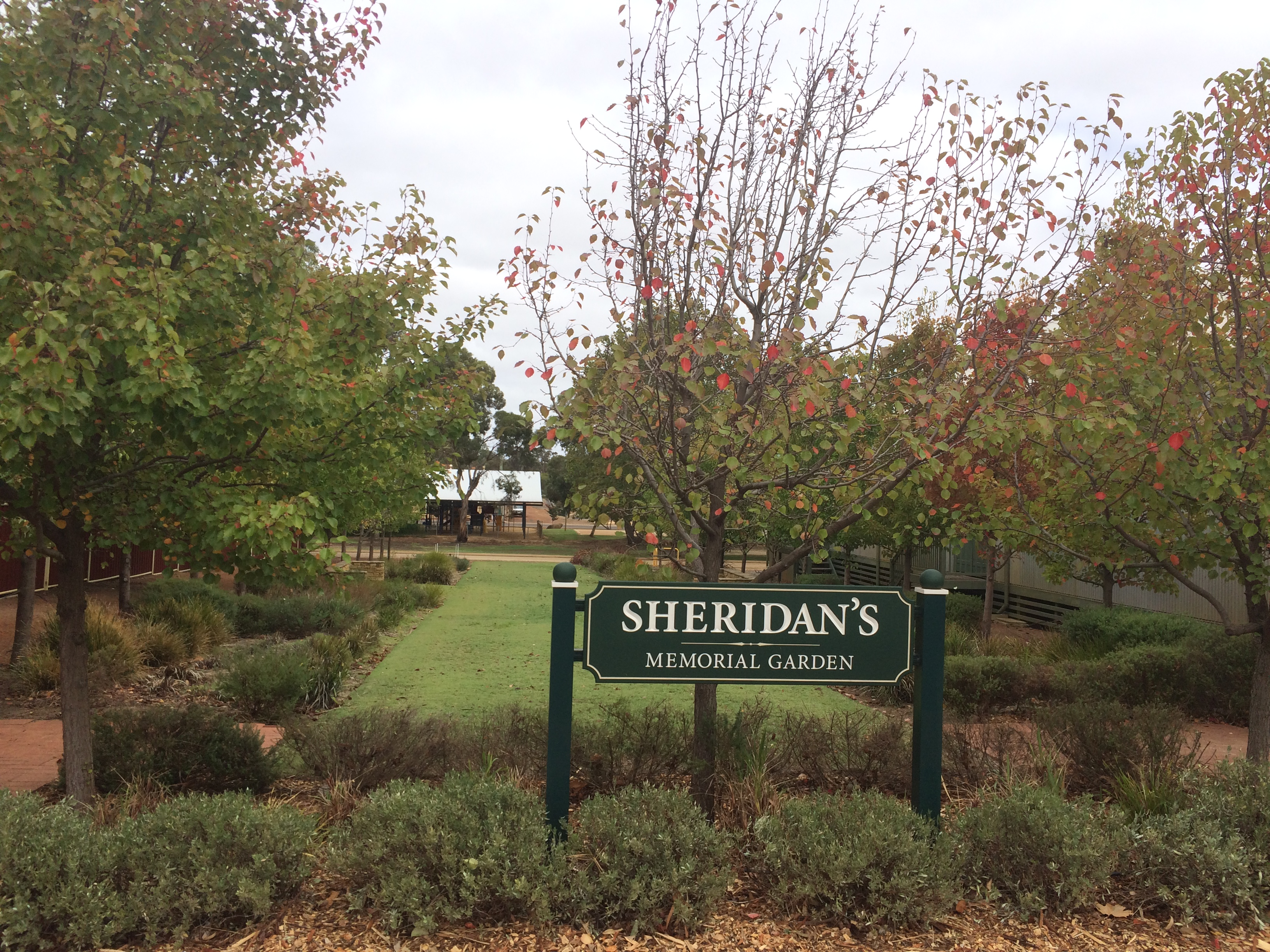
Sheridan's memorial garden 2018

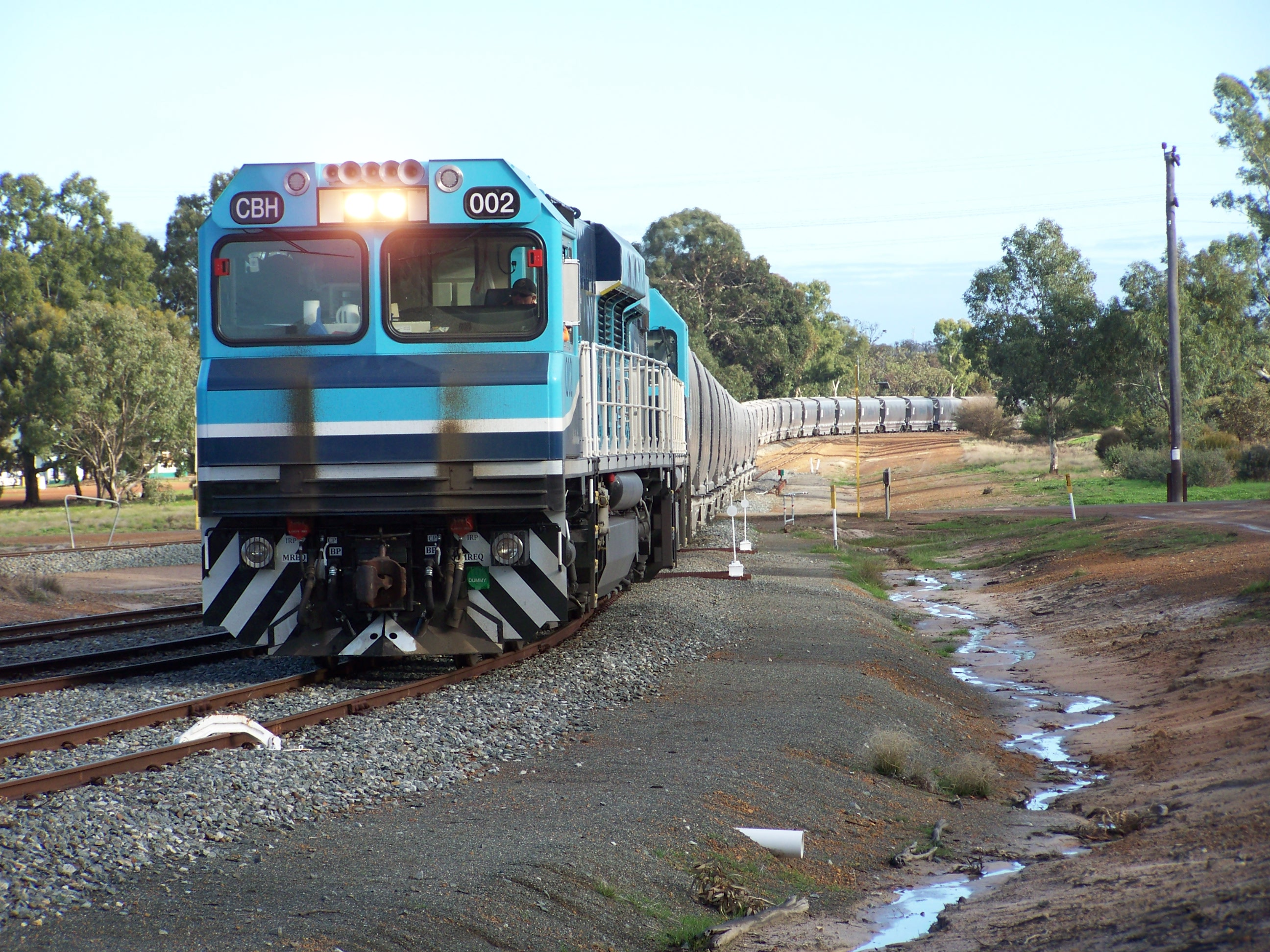
CBH Group train at Broomehill

Broomehill is a town on the Great Southern Highway between Katanning and Albany, in the Great Southern region of Western Australia. Its local government area is the Shire of Broomehill-Tambellup. While the townsite's name is Broomehill, the locality's official name is Broomehill Village, to differentiate it from the surrounding localities of Broomehill East and Broomehill West. Townsite and locality share identical borders..

== History ==
The town of Broomehill (originally Broome Hill) owes its creation to the Great Southern Railway, which was completed in 1889. The railway runs from Beverley to Albany. Broomehill is named after Sir Frederick Napier Broome (1842–1896) who was then the Governor of Western Australia.

Gold bearing quartz was discovered by the station master around Broomehill in 1889.

In the same year Patrick Garrity purchased two lots facing Jasper Street and built a galvanised iron hotel. By 1905 the hotel had been rebuilt in brick with more extensions added in 1908. Known as the Broomehill Hotel and later as the Imperial Hotel, the two storey tuck pointed building is now heritage listed.

The townsite was gazetted by the Western Australian Land Company in 1890, which was recognised by the state government in 1897. A group of settlers from the now extinct town of Eticup moved to the present site of Broomehill to help establish a township after the construction of the railway was completed. These settlers included the Walshes, and the Curnows. These three families worked hard to establish the early structures. A Victorian named Hamilton acquired 1,300 acres (526 ha) of land around the townsite in 1890; T. W. Powell also acquired 1,000 acres (405 ha) near the town from the Western Australian Land Company.

A branch of the Commercial Bank of Australia was opened in the town-site in 1891.

In 1892, a police station and post office were also established. The Imperial Hotel was operating in the town by late 1892.

The Broomehill Agricultural Hall was opened by T. Norris, a settler of the area, in 1898. The population of the town was 72 (37 males and 35 females) in 1898.

A local Progress association was formed in 1905 with C.J. Darcy taking the position of chairman.

Broomehill Football Club had been established in or before 1907, playing games against surrounding towns such as Katanning.

In the 1930's, Emile Genoni's farm named 'Etna' in Broome Hill was one of a group twelve farms around Australia experimenting with farming practices nowadays known as biodynamic agriculture.

A cooperative was discussed in 1920 with insufficient capital being raised, in 1921 the cooperative commenced operations after having taken over the premises of Messrs E. Garrity and Company. The official spelling of Broomehill was changed from two words to one in 1959.

== Economy ==
The main industry in town is wheat farming with the town being a Cooperative Bulk Handling receival site. There is also some sheep farming, while more recently farmers have diversified into viticulture and aquaculture (in the form of barramundi farming).

== Features ==
The Holland Track, a well known walking and 4WD track, begins in Broomehill and ends in Coolgardie. The 700 kilometres (435 mi) track was established in 1893 by the pioneer John Holland through the bush via Newdegate to the goldfields at Coolgardie.
