= Great Southern Highway =

Highway in Western Australia

Great Southern Highway Western Australia
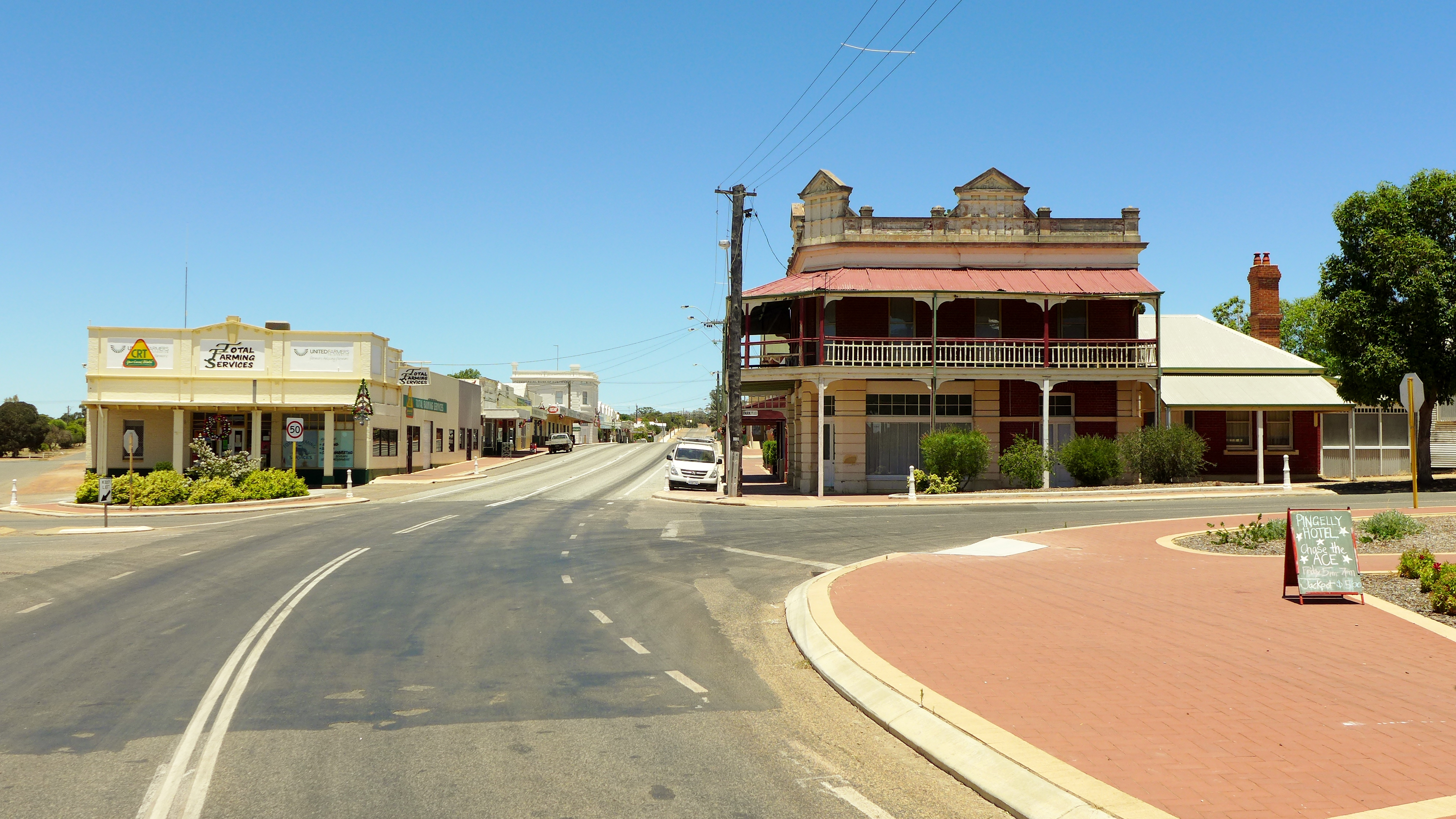
- The Great Southern Highway at Pingelly, 2014
- Map of south-west Western Australia with Great Southern Highway highlighted in red

General information
- Type: Highway
- Length: 374 km (232 mi)
- Route number(s): State Route 120 (York – Cranbrook)

Major junctions
- North end: Great Eastern Highway (National Highway 94), The Lakes
- Northam–York Road (State Route 120); Westdale Road; Brookton–Corrigin Road (State Route 40); Brookton Highway (State Route 40); Wagin-Dumbleyung Road (State Route 107); Arthur Road (State Route 107)
- South end: Albany Highway (State Route 30), Cranbrook

Location(s)
- Major settlements: York, Beverley, Brookton, Narrogin, Wagin, Katanning

Highway system
- Highways in Australia; National Highway • Freeways in Australia; Highways in Western Australia

Great Southern Highway is a highway in the southern Wheatbelt region of Western Australia, starting from Great Eastern Highway at The Lakes, 50 km (31 mi) from Perth, and ending at Albany Highway near Cranbrook. It is the primary thoroughfare for this part of Western Australia and runs parallel with the Perth–Albany railway for its entire length. It is signed as State Route 120 from York to Cranbrook, and was first named in 1949, although it was built well before that time.

== Description ==
The highway initially travels east to the historic town of York, before following the Avon Valley and the railway roughly southwards until Narrogin. The highway then runs parallel with Albany Highway at a distance of about 30 km (19 mi) through Wagin and Katanning before curving to approach Albany Highway where it ends 4 km (2.5 mi) past Cranbrook. Many of the towns along this highway have prominent grain silos, and Narrogin, Wagin and Katanning have remained important population centres sustained by agriculture and its supporting industries.

== Towns ==
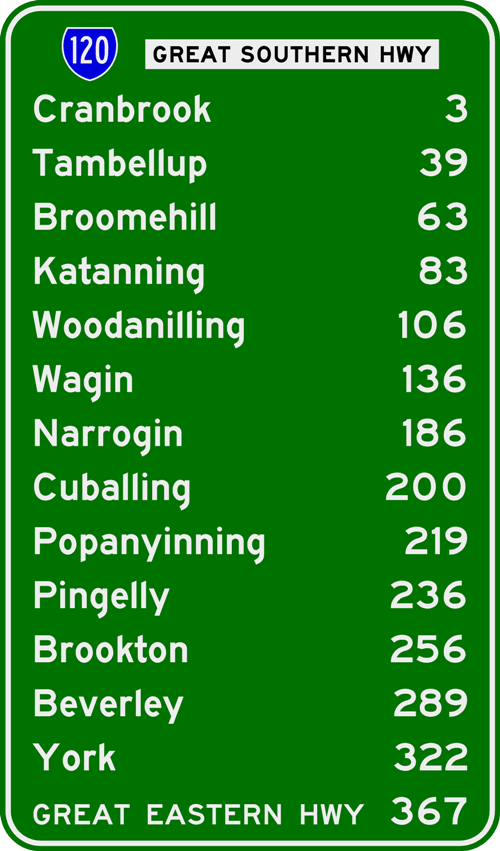
Distances to towns along Great Southern Highway, as referenced from the southern end of State Route 120, at its junction with Albany Highway.

Towns on this highway include:

- The Lakes
- York
- Beverley
- Brookton
- Pingelly
- Popanyinning
- Cuballing
- Narrogin
- Highbury
- Wagin
- Woodanilling
- Katanning
- Broomehill
- Tambellup
- Cranbrook

== See also ==
- Media related to Great Southern Highway at Wikimedia Commons
- Highways in Australia
- List of highways in Western Australia
