= Katanning, Western Australia =

Katanning
- Town
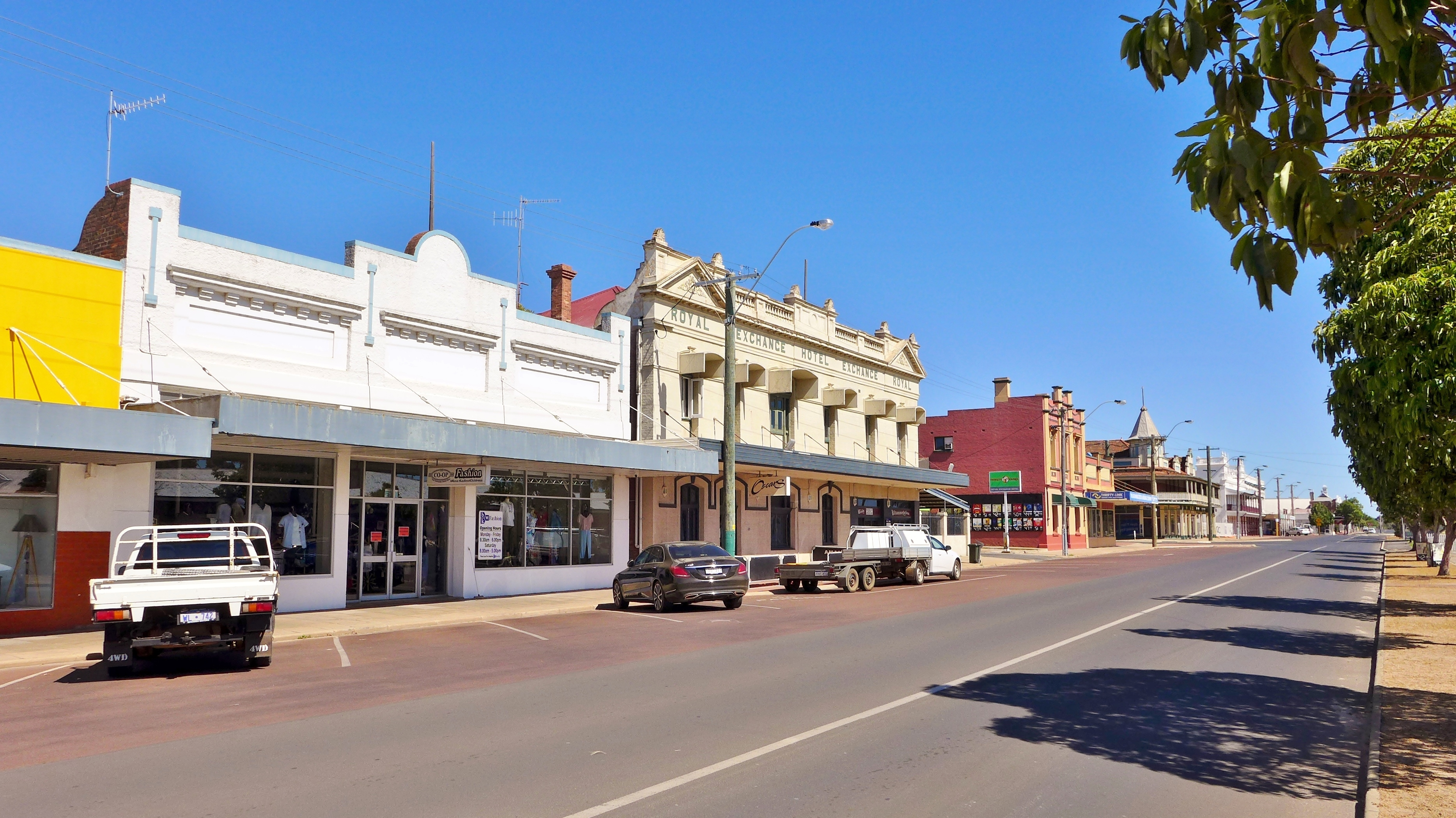
- Austral Terrace, Katanning, 2018

- Interactive map of Katanning
- Coordinates: 33°41′27″S 117°33′19″E
- Country: Australia
- State: Western Australia
- LGA: Shire of Katanning
- Location: 277 km (172 mi) SE of Perth; 103 km (64 mi) SSE of Narrogin; 170 km (110 mi) NNW of Albany; 240 km (150 mi) E of Bunbury
- Established: 1898

Government
  - State electorate: Roe
  - Federal division: O'Connor

Area
  - Total: 136.3 km^{2} (52.6 sq mi)
- Elevation: 311 m (1,020 ft)

Population
  - Total: 3,641 (UCL 2021)
- Postcode: 6317
- Mean max temp: 22.1 °C (71.8 °F)
- Mean min temp: 9.3 °C (48.7 °F)
- Annual rainfall: 478.9 mm (18.85 in)

Katanning is a town located 277 kilometres (172 mi) south-east of Perth, Western Australia on the Great Southern Highway. At the 2021 census, the population was 4,057, up from a 2016 population of 3,687.

== History ==
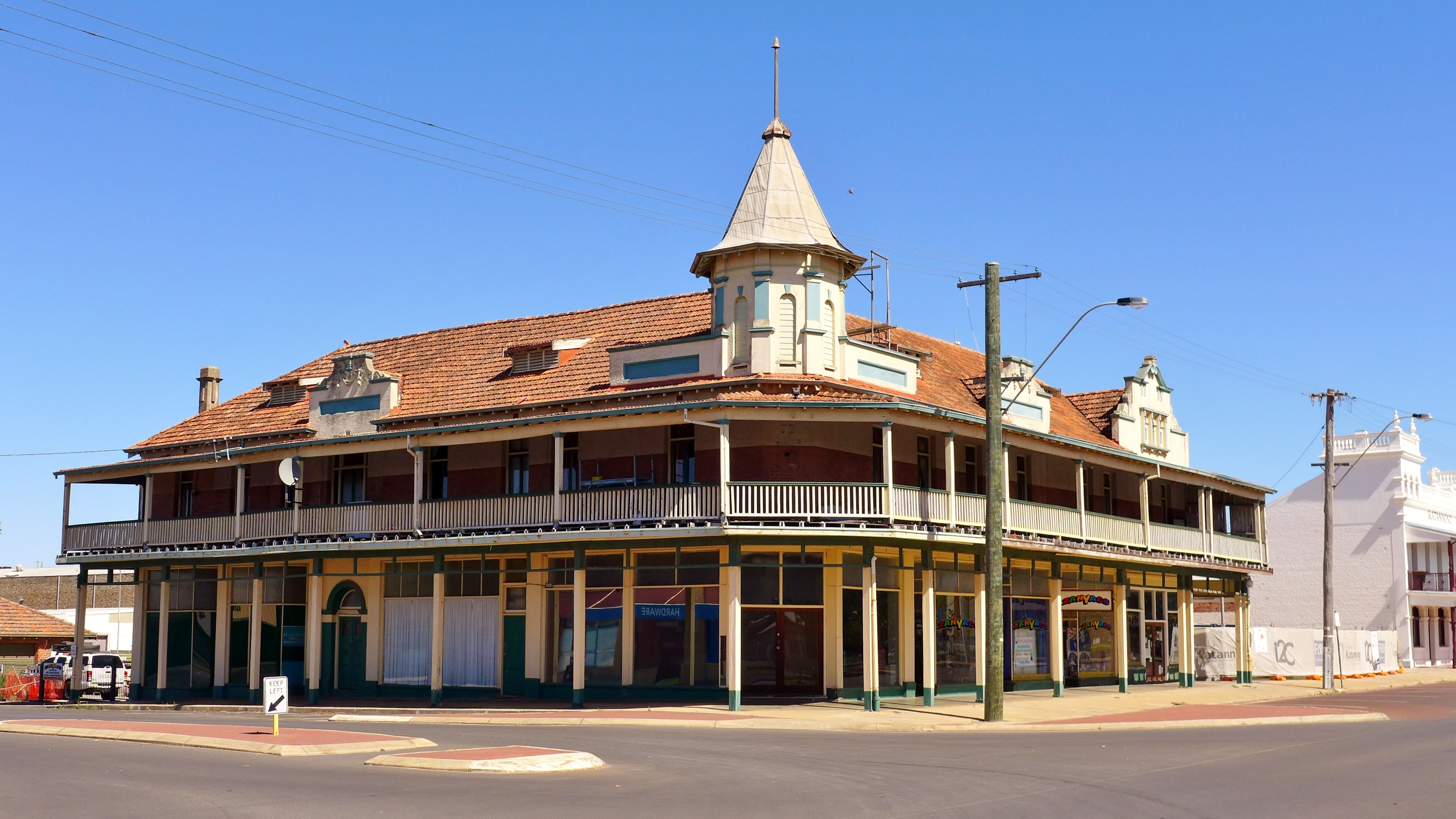
King George Hostel, Katanning, 2018

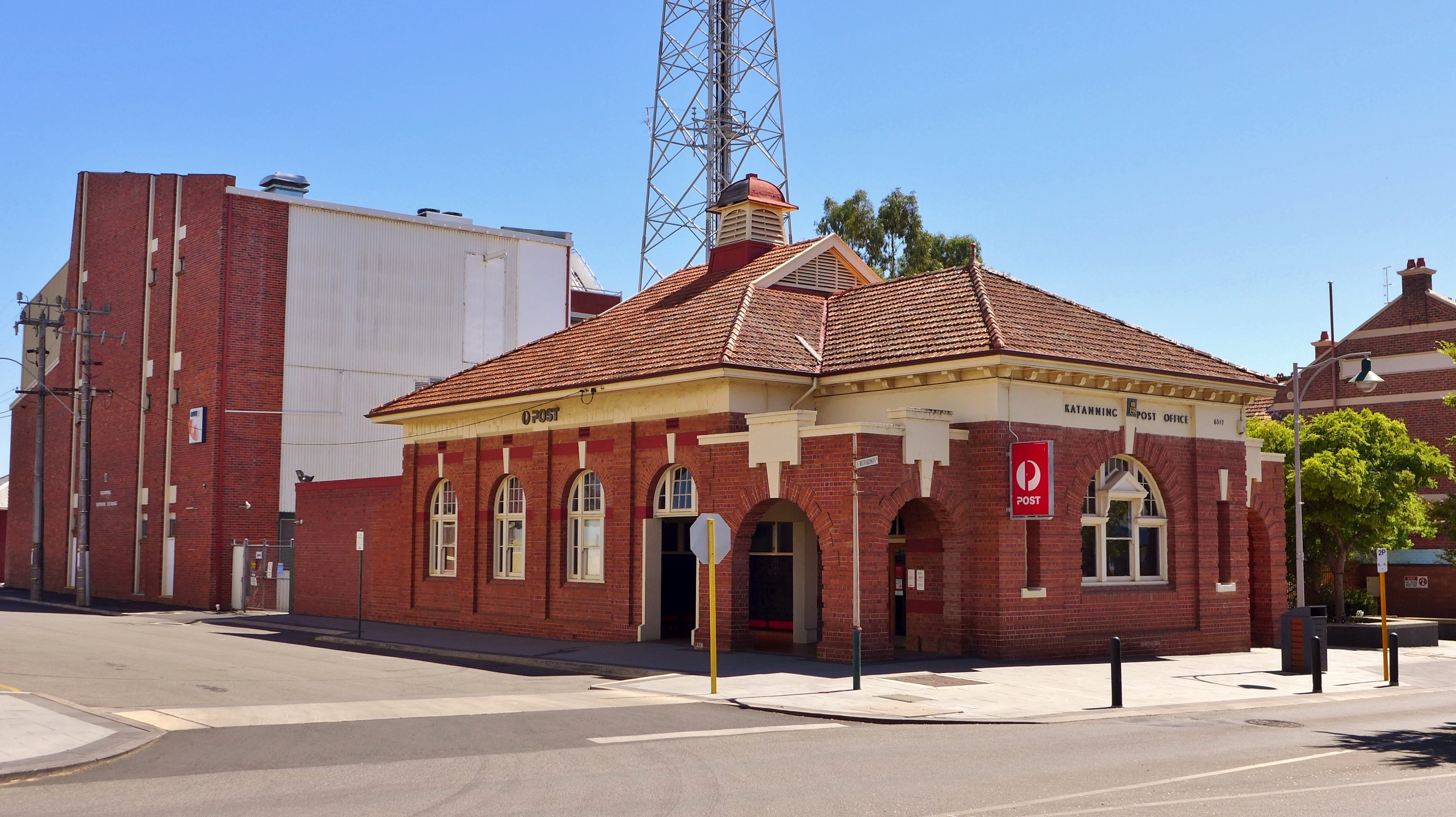
Katanning Post Office, 2018

The name Katanning is derived from the Aboriginal name for a camping place. That name for the camp was Kartannup, with kart meaning 'head' and annup meaning 'meeting place' or 'camping place'. In the very early days before town settlement, a big group of traditional custodians lived in the area. When the community of another district would visit annually, Kartannup was the head camp or meeting place. Some sources say that Kartanup means 'clear pool of sweet water', or that Katanning means 'spiders on your back'. Others suggest that the place is named after a local Aboriginal woman.

The first Europeans to explore the Katanning area were Governor James Stirling and Surveyor General John Septimus Roe who travelled through the area in 1835 en route from Perth to Albany.

In about 1870, sandalwood cutters moved into the area but they did not settle. It was not until the development of the Great Southern Railway, a land grant railway built by the West Australian Land Company from Beverley to Albany in 1889, that the township came into existence.

The townsite was initially developed by the West Australian Land Company. The state government purchased the railway and the townsite in 1896 and later formally gazetted the town in 1898, when the population of the town was 226, comprising 107 males and 119 females.

In April 1891 the Premier Roller Flour Mill was opened in the centre of the town by brothers Frederick Henry Piesse and Charles Austin Piesse. The mill provided an important cash market for local wheat growers. Initially the mill supplied flour to the whole of the Albany district, replacing more expensive imports from Adelaide. At that time Albany was Western Australia's principal port. The ground-floor street frontages of the mill were converted into shops from the 1930s, including a music shop, butchers, dress shops, a barber, and tearooms. By 2008 the building was owned by the Shire of Katanning, which sold it for A$1 to a private developer who renovated the by-then dilapidated building and turned it into a hotel and restaurant that opened in 2018.

Katanning remains an important centre on the Great Southern Railway to Albany.

== Features ==
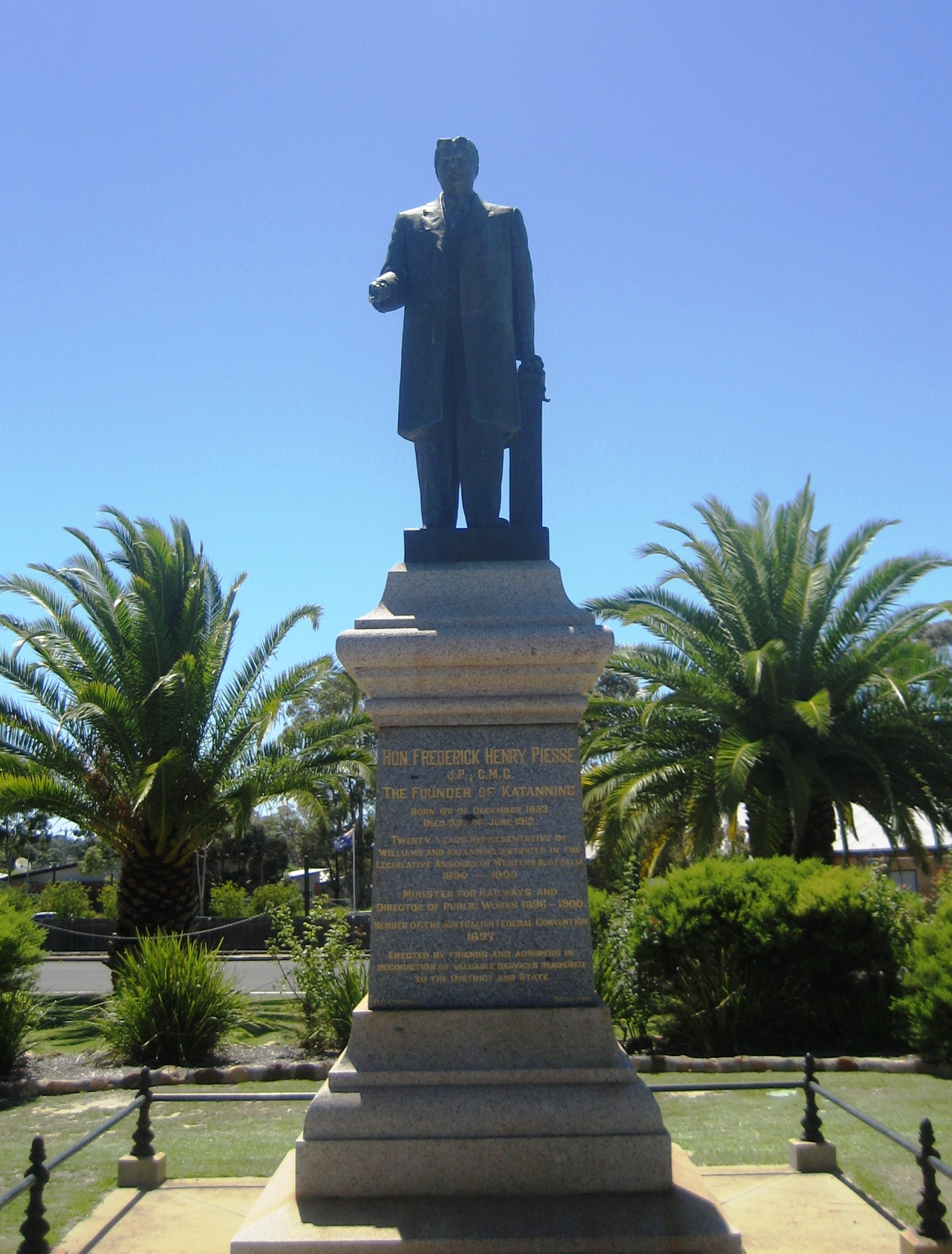
Frederick Henry Piesse statue, Katanning

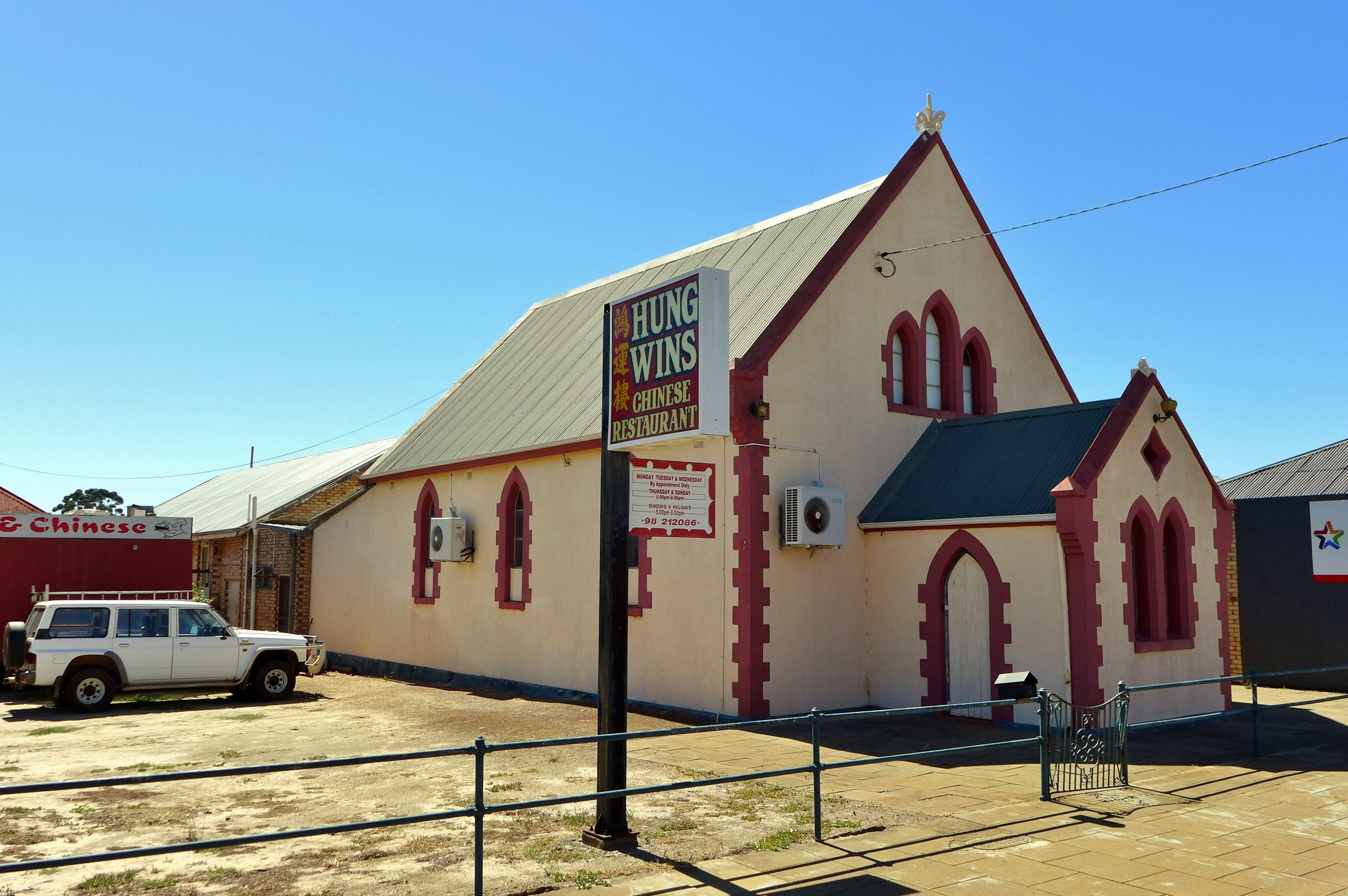
Hung Wins Restaurant (formerly a Baptist church), Katanning

A statue of Frederick Henry Piesse (by sculptor Pietro Porcelli) was erected in 1916 and stands beside the railway line in Austral Terrace. The Piesse family constructed a regal mansion which was named Kobeelya and after being used for many years as a girls' boarding school, is now a conference centre managed by the local Baptist church.

Katanning features a unique playground of oversized structures named the All Ages Playground. The town has many other attractions, including a recreation, leisure and function centre.

Katanning has a relatively large Muslim population of about 350 people and consequently has a mosque, the Katanning Mosque. The vast majority of local Muslims originated in the Cocos (Keeling) Islands, and travelled to Katanning to work in the local abattoir, which was established in the late 1970s.

Other religious buildings include churches of Anglican, Baptist, Catholic, Lutheran, Seventh Day Adventist, Uniting, and Wesleyan denominations, along with a Jehovah's Witness Kingdom Hall.

The town has a castle-like structure that was built as a winery. The town's entrance features an antique truck loaded with imitation wool bales, a windmill, and several sculptures of sheep made from corrugated iron.

The town has become a regional service centre for the Great Southern, and services the nearby towns of Broomehill, Tambellup and Woodanilling plus several more. It contains three primary schools (Katanning Primary School, Braeside Primary School, and St Patrick's School), and a high school (Katanning Senior High School).

== Transport ==
Katanning railway station has an elevation of 1,024 feet (312 m) above sea level and a rail distance of 225 miles (362 km) from Perth.

== Climate ==
Katanning sits on the border between the warm-summer and the purely subtropical mediterranean varieties with January and February being just below 22 °C (72 °F). Under the Köppen climate classification it is classified as Csb.

Climate data for Katanning (normals 1999-2025)
Month	Jan	Feb	Mar	Apr	May	Jun	Jul	Aug	Sep	Oct	Nov	Dec	Year
Record high °C (°F)	43.8 (110.8)	44.6 (112.3)	41.7 (107.1)	36.1 (97.0)	32.3 (90.1)	24.1 (75.4)	22.2 (72.0)	25.9 (78.6)	31.3 (88.3)	37.8 (100.0)	41.0 (105.8)	43.3 (109.9)	44.6 (112.3)
Mean maximum °C (°F)	40.2 (104.4)	38.9 (102.0)	36.5 (97.7)	31.2 (88.2)	26.3 (79.3)	20.6 (69.1)	18.9 (66.0)	20.9 (69.6)	24.9 (76.8)	31.8 (89.2)	35.9 (96.6)	39.6 (103.3)	41.3 (106.3)
Mean daily maximum °C (°F)	30.3 (86.5)	29.9 (85.8)	27.1 (80.8)	23.2 (73.8)	19.3 (66.7)	16.0 (60.8)	14.8 (58.6)	15.5 (59.9)	17.7 (63.9)	22.0 (71.6)	25.9 (78.6)	28.9 (84.0)	22.6 (72.6)
Daily mean °C (°F)	22.0 (71.6)	22.1 (71.8)	20.2 (68.4)	17.1 (62.8)	14.0 (57.2)	11.5 (52.7)	10.4 (50.7)	10.8 (51.4)	12.0 (53.6)	14.8 (58.6)	18.0 (64.4)	20.4 (68.7)	16.1 (61.0)
Mean daily minimum °C (°F)	13.7 (56.7)	14.2 (57.6)	13.2 (55.8)	11.0 (51.8)	8.6 (47.5)	7.0 (44.6)	6.0 (42.8)	6.0 (42.8)	6.3 (43.3)	7.6 (45.7)	10.0 (50.0)	11.8 (53.2)	9.6 (49.3)
Mean minimum °C (°F)	8.2 (46.8)	8.4 (47.1)	7.4 (45.3)	5.7 (42.3)	3.8 (38.8)	2.3 (36.1)	1.1 (34.0)	1.3 (34.3)	1.2 (34.2)	1.9 (35.4)	4.3 (39.7)	6.4 (43.5)	0.2 (32.4)
Record low °C (°F)	5.0 (41.0)	5.0 (41.0)	1.5 (34.7)	1.4 (34.5)	−1.1 (30.0)	−3.0 (26.6)	−2.0 (28.4)	−2.2 (28.0)	−2.0 (28.4)	−0.7 (30.7)	0.0 (32.0)	2.7 (36.9)	−3.0 (26.6)
Average precipitation mm (inches)	17.4 (0.69)	13.2 (0.52)	23.4 (0.92)	28.9 (1.14)	45.6 (1.80)	55.4 (2.18)	62.0 (2.44)	60.7 (2.39)	47.5 (1.87)	29.5 (1.16)	22.7 (0.89)	20.2 (0.80)	426.5 (16.8)
Average precipitation days	3.4	2.7	5.9	7.6	12.1	16.3	19.5	18.3	15.8	9.6	6.4	3.7	121.3
Average relative humidity (%)	31	31	35	43	51	60	65	64	58	46	33	29	46
Average dew point °C (°F)	7.7 (45.9)	8.3 (46.9)	7.9 (46.2)	7.8 (46.0)	7.3 (45.1)	6.8 (44.2)	6.8 (44.2)	6.9 (44.4)	7.0 (44.6)	6.6 (43.9)	5.4 (41.7)	5.5 (41.9)	7.0 (44.6)
Mean daily sunshine hours	11.1	10.7	8.5	6.5	5.8	5.4	5.1	5.0	6.7	9.3	10.3	10.8	7.9
Source 1:
Source 2:

== Demographics ==
As of the 2021 census, 9.3% of the town is Indigenous.

=== Cocos Malay community ===
Katanning is known for its large Malay community. However, most of the Malays in the town descend from Christmas Island or the Cocos (Keeling) Islands. In the 1970s, the local abattoir (the largest employer in Katanning) began employing Cocos Malays to cater to the halal market overseas and back home in Australia. Malay culture and cuisine and the Malay language are present in the town, and it was the Malay community that built the local mosque in 1980.

As of the 2021 census, 5.6% of the town's residents speak Malay (mostly Cocos Malay) at home. 9.3% of the town is Muslim.

The town has received tourists from Malaysia due to its large Malay population, which was made known to Malaysians by multiple Malaysian travel YouTubers who visited the town, with their videos garnering over a million views.

== Notable residents ==
- Shai Bolton, Australian rules footballer
- Kevin O'Halloran, Olympic gold medallist swimmer, born in Katanning
- Percy Gratwick, posthumous Victoria Cross recipient in World War II, born in Katanning
- Angela Ryder, a Wilman Noongar woman
- Tiah Toth, AFLW player
- Mark Williams, Australian rules footballer
- Lydia Williams, goalkeeper for the Australia women's national soccer team
- Alan Quartermaine, WAFL footballer, 1975 Sandover Medallist
- Dave Shaw, cave diver
