= Great Southern Railway (Western Australia) =

Former railway company in Western Australia

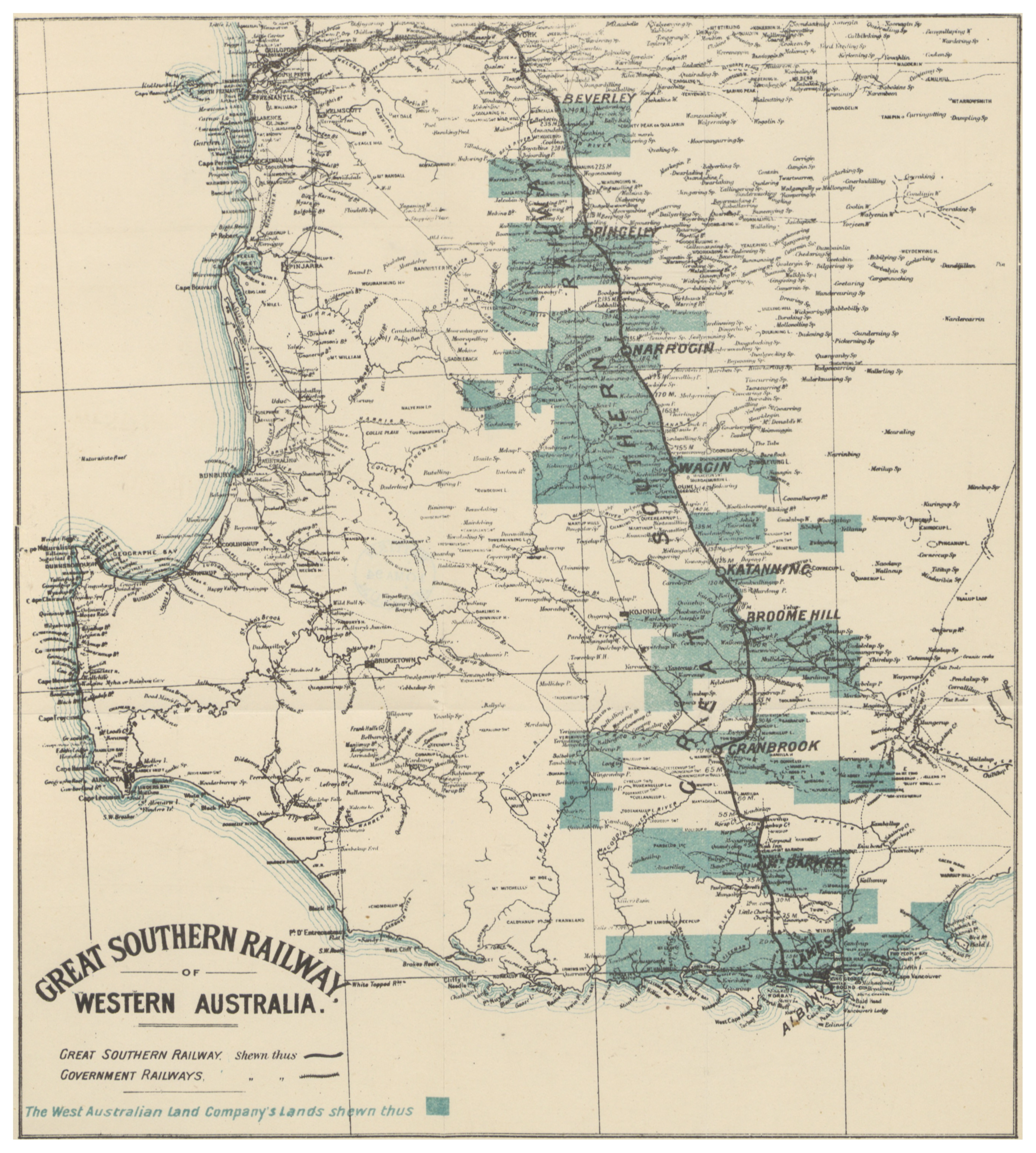
- Great Southern Railway of Western Australia (1894)

Overview
- Main state: Western Australia
- Dates of operation: 1886–1896
- Successor: Western Australian Government Railways

Technical
- Track gauge: 3 ft 6 in (1,067 mm)

The Great Southern Railway was a railway company that operated from Beverley to Albany in Western Australia between 1889 and 1896. In 1896 the Western Australian Government Railways took over the company, and kept the name for the route.

== Land development ==
The Great Southern Railway project was directly tied in with developments of lands related to agriculture.

== Construction ==
The Beverley–Albany Railway Act 1884 (48 Vict. No. 21), an act by the Western Australian Legislative Council and the Governor of Western Australia, assented to on 13 September 1884, authorised the construction of the railway line from Beverley to Albany.

The first sods for the 3 ft 6 in (1,067 mm) gauge railway were turned on 20 October 1886. This occurred simultaneously at Beverley and Albany by Lady Broome and the Governor Sir Frederick Broome respectively. The final spike was driven on 14 February 1889, 122 miles (196 km) north of Albany. The official opening of the line was on 1 June 1889.

The construction of the railway was significant for the development of economic activity in the region and led to the establishment of grain and sheep grazing, along with the development of towns such as Katanning, Broomehill, Tambellup, Cranbrook, Mount Barker and Woodanilling. Other small settlements and establishments that had grown up around the mail coach route that the railway replaced, such as Chockerup Inn, were abandoned due to a lack of travellers.

There was some initial debate over where the railway line should be placed. In the end, the link was made from an existing line ending at Beverley because it was the cheapest option. This devastated residents of the town of Kojonup, who initially hoped the line would pass through their town and follow the Albany Highway.

== Conversion to diesel ==
Steam locomotives were withdrawn from mainline work in Western Australia in 1971 – the process of removing steam from the Great Southern line had serious economic effects upon the towns of Narrogin and Katanning where extensive barracks and services relative to steam operations were closed down after this date.

== Present ==
Currently the line is managed by Arc Infrastructure. The majority of movements are CBH grain trains out of the Albany and Wagin depots.

== See also ==
- Midland Railway of Western Australia § Land development
