= Glencoe =

Glencoe was a place name used by Scottish immigrants to name several places in the world. It may also refer to:

- Glen Coe, Lochaber, Highland, Scotland
  - Massacre of Glencoe, 1692
  - Glencoe, Highland, a village in the glen
    - Glencoe Lochan, a tract of forest near the village

== Other places ==
=== Australia ===
- Glencoe, New South Wales
- Glencoe, Queensland, a locality in the Toowoomba Region
- Glencoe, South Australia
- Glencoe Station, in Queensland
- Delamere Station (pastoral lease), in the Northern Territory, once known as Glencoe
- Glencoe, Western Australia, a locality of the Shire of Woodanilling

=== Canada ===
- Glencoe, Nova Scotia (disambiguation)
- Glencoe, Ontario
- Glencoe Island, Nunavut
- Glencoe, Restigouche County, New Brunswick

=== New Zealand ===
- Glencoe, New Zealand

=== South Africa ===
- Glencoe, KwaZulu-Natal

=== United States ===
- Glencoe, Alabama
- Glencoe, California
- Glencoe, Florida
- Glencoe, Idaho
- Glencoe, Illinois
  - Glencoe station, a railroad station
- The Glencoe (Indianapolis, Indiana), listed in the National Register of Historic Places (NRHP) in Center Township of Indianapolis, Indiana
- Glencoe, Kentucky
- Glencoe, Louisiana
- Glencoe, Maryland
  - Glencoe (Glencoe, Maryland), listed in the NRHP in Maryland
- Glencoe, Minnesota
- Glencoe, Missouri
- Glencoe (Newark, New Jersey), listed in the NRHP in New Jersey
- Glencoe, New Mexico
- Glencoe, North Carolina
- Glencoe, Ohio
- Glencoe, Oklahoma
- Glencoe, Oregon
- Glencoe (Radford, Virginia), listed in the NRHP in Virginia
- Glencoe, Wisconsin, a town
- Glencoe (community), Wisconsin, an unincorporated community

== Other uses ==
- Glencoe (play), an 1840 tragedy by Thomas Talfourd
- Glencoe I, British Thoroughbred racehorse
- Glencoe II, Australian Thoroughbred racehorse, won 1868 Melbourne Cup

== See also ==
- Glencoe High School (disambiguation)
- Glynco, Georgia
