= List of heritage places in the Shire of Woodanilling =

List of heritage sites in Western Australia

The State Register of Heritage Places is maintained by the Heritage Council of Western Australia. As of 2026, 224 places are heritage-listed in the Shire of Woodanilling, of which one is on the State Register of Heritage Places, the Carrolup Aboriginal Cemetery in Marribank. The cemetery is part of the also state heritage listed Carrolup Native Settlement, which was state heritage listed on 22 May 2007 but is predominantly located in the neighbouring Shire of Kojonup.

== List ==
=== State Register of Heritage Places ===
The Western Australian State Register of Heritage Places, as of 2026, lists the following state registered place within the Shire of Woodanilling:

Place name	Place #	Street number	Street name	Suburb or town	Co-ordinates	Notes & former names	Photo
Carrolup Aboriginal Cemetery	17127		Cemetery Road	Marribank	33.639065°S 117.256975°E		

=== Shire of Woodanilling heritage-listed places ===
The following places are heritage listed in the Shire of Woodanilling but are not State registered:

Place name	Place #	Street number	Street name	Suburb or town	Notes & former names	Photo
Woodanilling Baptist Church	2754	30	Robinson Road	Woodanilling		
National Bank & Hotel	2755			Woodanilling		
Cartmeticup Baptist Church	2756	Corner	Church & Cronin Roads	Cartmeticup		
Beaufort River	2912			Woodanilling		
Kalang Farm	3296		Shenton Road	Woodanilling		
Francis Brook	3520			Marribank		
Wandibirrup Pool, Beaufort River	3530	Near	Albany Highway	Woodanilling	Cavanaghs Pool	
Boyerine Creek	3760			Boyerine		
Yelyelling Gully	3761	Near	Glencoe Homestead	Cartmeticup	Yelyellan	
Toojelup Pool, Beaufort River	3762	Near	Albany Highway	Woodanilling	6 Mile Pool	
Martup Pool, Beaufort River	3763	Near	Albany Highway/Robinson Road Junction	Woodanilling		
Deep Pool, Beaufort River	3764		Albany Highway, near Beaufort Bridge	Woodanilling		
Washpool, Beaufort River	3765		Albany Highway	Woodanilling		
Quongaring Pool	3766		Quongaring Gully South-West of	Woodanilling	Quongering Pool	
Dolapin Pool	3767		Boyerine Creek	West Boyerine		
Boyerine Pool	3768		Boyerine Creek	Boyerine		
Bintamilling Pool	3769		Boyerine Creek	Boyerine		
Ngeatalling Pool	3770		Boyerine Creek North of	Woodanilling		
Richardson and Co Store, Woodanilling	10412		Robinson Road	Woodanilling		
Woodanilling War Memorial & Honour Roll	14358			Woodanilling		
Woodanilling Hotel	14948		Burt Road	Woodanilling	Woodanilling Tavern	
Round Pool	16901		Moojebing Creek	Woodanilling		
Martinup Lake	16904		Douglas Road	Beaufort River Flats		
Murapin Lake	16905		Douglas Road	Kenmare		
Little Murapin (Lake)	16906		Douglas Road	Kenmare		
Lake Charling	16907			Beaufort River Flats		
Queerearrup Lake	16908		Queerearrup Road	Kenmare		
Flagstaff Lake	16909		Flagstaff Road	Kenmare		
Wardering Lake	16910		Flagstaff & Douglas Roads	Kenmare		
Billie Light Swamp	16911		Flagstaff Road	Kenmare		
Rushy Swamp	16912	Corner	Flagstaff & Douglas Roads	Kenmare		
Kidney Swamp	16913		Reschke Road	Kenmare		
Washpool	16914		Boyerine Creek, Robinson Road	Woodanilling	Andrews' Washpool	
Salt Spring	16915		The Beaufort	Beaufort River		
Dungalar Spring	16916		Beaufort Station	Beaufort River	Dungarlaring Spring	
Convict Well	16917		Albany Highway	Beaufort River		
Kunmallup Well	16918		Robinson Road	Woodanilling		
Winjedyne Soak	16919			West Woodanilling		
Boyamine Water Hole	16920			West Woodanilling		
Mailalup Water Hole	16921	Corner	Hensman Road & Great Southern Highway	South Woodanilling		
Woodanilling Spring	16922		Moojebing Creek	Woodanilling		
Wardering Spring	16923		Flagstaff Road	Kenmare		
Purgatory Soak	16924			Boyerine		
Bokaring Waterhole	17020			Bokaring		
Cartmeticup Well	17021		Cartmeticup Road	Cartmeticup		
Whatanine Soak	17022		Harvey Road	Cartmeticup		
Yairibin Well	17023		Oxley Road	Woodanilling		
Woolkabunning Well	17024		Harvey Road	Cartmeticup		
Woolkabin Stake Well	17035	Loc 2776	Woolkabin' Ballaying South Road	Woolkabin		
Bookabunning Soak	17036		Katanning/Dummbleryung Road	Glencoe		
Government Dam	17038		Robinson Road	West Woodanilling		
Town Soak	17039		Robinson Road	Woodanilling		
Town Well	17040		Robinson Road	Woodanilling		
First Town Dam	17041		Robinson Road	Woodanilling		
Second Town Dam	17042			Woodanilling		
Railway Well	17043			Woodanilling	'Round Pool'	
Government Wells	17044		Katanning-Dumbleyung	Yairabin		
Government Dam	17045		Oxley Road, Bullock Hills	Woolkabin		
Government Dam	17095		Robinson Road	East Woodanilling		
Kenine Soak	17097		Robinson Road	West Woodanilling		
Balgarran Water Hole	17098		River Road	Carrolup River		
Coben Hill	17099		Coben Soak & Harrison Roads	Woodanilling	Dum 17	
Martup Hills	17100		'The Beaufort'	Woodanilling	NT6	
Kunamullup Hill	17101		Robinson Road	West Woodanilling		
Kenine Hill	17102		Fowler's Road	West Woodanilling	NT4	
Strathmore Hill	17103		Link Road	South-West Woodanilling	Hemstead Hills, NT1	
Kojonolokan Hills	17104		Kojonokolan Road	West Boyerine		
Puridine Hill	17105		Ashwell Road	Boyerine	Haycocks	
Mine Hill	17106		Stronach Road	Boyerine	NT3	
Mount Rice	17107		Great Southern Highway	Boyerine	Becker's Hill	
Yonging Hill	17108		Robinson Road	Woodanilling		
Radio Hill	17109		Burt Road	Woodanilling		
Bunny's Peak	17110		Great Southern Highway	North Boyerine		
Goldney Hill	17111		Lime Lake Road	East/North Boyerine		
King Rock	17112		Shackley Road	Cartmeticup		
Melbourne Vale	17113		Albany Highway & Orchard Road	South-West Woodanilling		
Spring Plains	17114		Ashwell Road	Boyerine		
Peel Plains	17115			North Boyerine		
Haymaker Downs	17116		Oakland Road	North-East Woodanilling		
Beaufort Bridge graves	17117		Albany Highway	Beaufort		
Kunmallup graves	17118		Robinson Road	West Woodanilling		
Boyaminning graves	17119		Orchard Road	SW Woodanilling		
Heath's grave	17120		Ashwell Road	Kojonolokan		
Fisher's grave	17121			Bokaring Creek		
Shepherd's grave	17122		Harvey Road	Bokaring		
Black Family graves	17123		Clifden Road	Cartmeticup		
Whatanine graves	17124		Harvey Road	Cartmeticup		
Samuel Blackmore's grave	17125		Katanning-Dumbleyung Road	Glencoe		
Woodanilling Cemetery	17126		Great Southern Highway	Woodanilling		
Dowlering School site (No. 1)	17128			Beaufort River		
Dowlering School site (No.2)	17129			Beaufort River		
Westwood School Site	17130	Corner	Robinson & Douglas Roads	West Woodanilling		
Boyerine School Site	17131		Watson Road	Boyerine		
Kenmare School Hall	17132		Reschke Road	Kenmare		
Cartmeticup School Site (No. 1)	17133		Cronin Road	Cartmeticup		
Cartmeticup School Site (No. 2)	17134	Corner	Harvey & School Roads	Cartmeticup		
Glencoe School Site	17135	Corner	Kelly & River Roads	Glencoe		
Woolkabin School Site	17136		Oxley Road	Bullock Hills	Bullock Hills Hall	
Woodanilling School	17137			Woodanilling		
Marracoonda Church	17138	Corner	Great Southern Highway & Onslow Road	Marracoonda	Also listed in the Shire of Katanning as Marracoonda Baptist Church (1363)	
Cartmeticup Baptist Church (No. 2)	17139	Corner	Church & Cronin Roads	Cartmeticup		
Manna Flat Church Services Site	17140		Harvey Road	Cartmeticup	Whatanine	
Kenmare Hall	17141		Reschkle Road	Kenmare		
Woodanilling Agricultural Hall Site	17142		Robinson Road	Woodanilling		
Woodanilling Hall	17143		Robinson Road	Woodanilling		
CWA Hall	17144		Robinson Road	Woodanilling		
Woodanilling Roads Board Office Site (No. 1)	17145		Burt Road	Woodanilling		
Woodanilling Roads Board Office Site (No. 2)	17146		Robinson Road	Woodanilling		
Shire Council Offices (Hall)	17147		Robinson Road	Woodanilling		
Woodanilling Shire Council Offices	17148		Robinson Road	Woodanilling		
Woodanilling Recreation Ground	17151		Burt/Yairabin Roads	Woodanilling		
Glencoe Oval	17152		Oxley Road	Glencoe		
Woodanilling Trotting Track Site	17153		Burt/Yairabin Roads	Woodanilling		
Woodanilling Golf Clubhouse	17154		Yairabin Road	Woodanilling		
Woodanilling Golf Clubhouse (present)	17155		Yairabin Road	Woodanilling		
Woodanilling Basketball (Netball) Courts (site 1)	17156		Yairabin Road	Woodanilling		
Woodanilling Basketball (Netball) Courts (site 2)	17157		Robinson Road	Woodanilling		
Woodanilling Rifle Range site	17158		Robinson Road	Woodanilling		
Glencoe Rifle Range Site	17159			Glencoe		
Woodanilling Hockey Ground	17160		Yairabin Road	Woodanilling		
Recreation Centre	17161		Yairabin Road	Woodanilling		
Kenmare Tennis Courts site	17162		Reschke Road	Kenmare		
Woodanilling Tennis Club	17163		Yairabin Road	Woodanilling		
Tennis Courts, Woodanilling School	17164		Carlton St	Woodanilling		
Tennis Courts	17165			Bullock Hills		
Skiing & Swimming Area Queerearrup Lake	17166		Queerearrup Road	Queerearrup		
Beaufort Bridge	17167		Albany Highway	Beaufort River		
Boyerine Bridge	17168		Great Southern Highway	Boyerine		
Boyerine Railway Bridge	17169		Burt Road	Boyerine		
Carrolup Bridge	17170		Carrolup River	Marribank		
Boyerine Siding Site	17189		Great Southern Highway	Boyerine		
Railway Ganger's House Site	17190			Boyerine		
Woodanilling Railway Station	17191		Great Southern Railway	Woodanilling		
Woodanilling Railway Goods Shed Site	17192		Great Southern Highway	Woodanilling		
Station Master's House Site	17193		Great Southern Highway	Woodanilling		
Railway Ganger's Hut Site	17194		Robinson Road	Woodanilling		
Boyerine Co-operative Bulk Handling site	17196		Great Southern Railway Boyerine Siding	Boyerine		
Co-operative Bulk Handling Facility	17197		Great Southern Railway	Woodanilling		
Post Office Site No. 1	17198		Burt Road	Woodanilling		
Post Office Site No.2	17199		Robinson Road	Woodanilling	Richardson & Co	
Post Office Site No.3	17200		Burt Road	Woodanilling		
Post Office Site No.4	17201		Robinson Road	Woodanilling		
Glencoe P.O. Site	17202		Katanning/Dumbleyung Road	Glencoe	(Cronin)	
Beaufort River Telephone Exchange site	17203		Albany Highway	Beaufort River		
Beaufort River Telephone Exchange	17204		Albany Highway	Beaufort River		
Woodanilling Telephone Exchange	17205		Robinson Road	Woodanilling		
Cartmeticup Telephone Exchange	17206		Darby Road	Cartmeticup		
Cartmeticup Telephone Exchange site No 1	17207		Harvey Road	Woodanilling	Whatanine, Manna Flats	
Congee Telephone Exchange site	17208		Dumbleyung Road	Congee	Katanning	
Telecommunications Tower	17209		Kenine Hill	West Woodanilling		
Bakery Site No 1	17210		Robinson Road	Woodanilling		
Bakery Site No 2	17211		Great Southern Highway	Woodanilling	Billabong Paddock	
Bakery Site No 3	17212		Robinson Road	Woodanilling		
Butcher's Site	17213		Burt Road	Woodanilling		
Saddler's Shop Site	17214		Robinson Road	Woodanilling		
Blacksmith's Shop Site	17215		Robinson Road	Woodanilling		
Garage (King's) Site	17217		Great Southern Highway/Robinson Road	Woodanilling		
Carrier's Site No 1	17218			Woodanilling		
Carrier's Site No 2	17219		Carlton St	Woodanilling		
Hotel Site	17220		Burt Road	Woodanilling		
Boarding House Site	17221		Robinson Road	Woodanilling	Grover's	
Co-operative Store	17222		Cnr Withnell Road / Robinson Road	Woodanilling		
Dival's Store Site	17223		Burt Road	Woodanilling		
Keirle's Store Site	17225		Shenton Road	Woodanilling		
National Bank Site	17226		Burt Road	North Woodanilling		
Coate's Brickworks Site	17227		Carlton Road	Woodanilling		
Baptist Manse	17228			Woodanilling		
Woodanilling Hospital	17229		Robinson Road	Woodanilling		
Beaufort River Garage Site	17230		Albany Highway	Beaufort River		
Beaufort River Tavern	17231		Albany Highway	Beaufort River		
Carter's Gold Mine	17232		Carter's Road	West Woodanilling		
Saleyards Site	17233			Woodanilling		
Market Garden Site (Lines)	17234		Robinson Road	West Woodanilling	Line's	
Bill Mader's Market Garden Site	17235		Robinson Road	West Woodanilling		
Vineyard Site	17236		Flagstaff Road	Wardering	(Billie Light)	
Vineyard Site	17237			Kenmare	Douglas	
Vineyard Site	17238		Robinson Road	West Woodanilling	(Trimming's)	
Vineyard Site	17239		Links Road	West Woodanilling	(Gus Mader)	
Vineyard Site	17240		Robinson Road	Woodanilling	(Kippin)	
Vineyard Site	17241		Trimmer Road	Cartmeticup	(Jefferies)	
Vineyard Site	17242		Hope Road	Cartmeticup	Patterson's	
Kunmallup Orchard	17243		"Kunmallup"	West Woodanilling		
Orchard site	17244		Robinson Road	West Woodanilling	Horseshoe, Carter's	
Carpenter Site	17245			Woodanilling		
Beaufort Homestead	17246		Ways Road	Beaufort River		
House Site	17247		Albany Highway	Beaufort Bridge	Dr Brown's	
House Site	17248		Albany Highway	Beaufort River	Gibb's	
Kunmallup House	17249		Robinson Road	West Woodanilling		
House site	17250		Robinson Road	West Woodanilling	Kenine	
House Site	17251		Quartermaine Road	West Woodanilling	Tim Quartemaine's	
House Site	17252		Quartermaine Road	West Woodanilling	George Ward's	
House Site	17253		Orchard Road	West Woodanilling	Boyaminning	
Winlaton House	17254		Link Road	West Woodanilling	Gus Mader	
Billy Greay's	17255		Orchard Road	West Woodanilling		
Westbury Homestead	17256		Cornwall Road	West Woodanilling		
Willingvale Homestead	17257		Newstead Road	South Woodanilling	Wilhelm	
House	17258	130/131	Newstead Road	South Woodanilling	Elijah Bell's	
Blacksmith's Shop	17259	104	Great Southern Highway	South Woodanilling	Severin	
House site	17260	129	Great Southern Highway	South Woodanilling		
Muckross House Site	17261		Great Southern Highway	South Woodanilling	Richard Bell's	
House Site	17262		Shenton Road	Woodanilling	Mrs Quartermaine's	
House Site	17263		Burt Road	North Woodanilling	Oliver Ward's	
House Site	17264		Burt Road	North Woodanilling	E Pittelkow's	
Elliot Springs, House - Sugg	17265		Sugg Road	Cartmeticup	Elliot Springs, Sugg	
Hope Farm House	17266		Hope Road	Cartmeticup	Patterson's	
Glencoe House Site	17267		Katanning / Dumbleyung Road	Glencoe	Cronin	
Kenmare Homestead	17268		Douglas Road	Kenmare	Douglas'	
'Jam Gully' Homestead	17269		Johnston Road	West Woodanilling	Fred Mader's	
August Terlick's Homestead	17270		Johnston Road	West Woodanilling	August Terlick's	
Homestead	17271		Burt Road	South Woodanilling	Rev Gilmour's	
Taylor's Homestead	17272		Robinson Road	Woodanilling		
Yairibin House Site	17273		Katanning / Dumbleyung Road	East Woodanilling		
Craneford Homestead	17274		Cartmeticup Road	Cartmeticup		
Yelyelling Homestead	17275		Oxley Road	Glencoe		
War Memorial	17276		Robinson Road	Woodanilling		
Salmon Gum Tree	17277			Woodanilling		
Beaufort Shearing Shed	23529		Ways Road	Beaufort River		
Beaufort Store	23530		Ways Road	Beaufort River		
Beaufort Well	23535		Ways Road	Beaufort River		
Beaufort Blacksmith Shop	23540		Ways Road	Beaufort River		
Beaufort Cottage	23542		Ways Road	Beaufort River		
Beaufort Shearing Shed	24716		Ways Road	Beaufort River		
Beaufort Store	24766		Ways Road	Beaufort River		
