= Beaufort River, Western Australia =

Locality in the Shire of Woodanilling, Western Australia

Beaufort River
- other
- Coordinates: 33.56611°S 117.03190°E
- Country: Australia
- State: Western Australia
- LGA(s): Shire of Woodanilling
- Location: 210 km (130 mi) SE of Perth; 180 km (110 mi) N of Albany; 36 km (22 mi) W of Woodanilling

Government
  - State electorate(s): Roe
  - Federal division(s): O'Connor

Area
  - Total: 172.5 km^{2} (66.6 sq mi)

Population
  - Total(s): 54 (SAL 2021)
- Postcode: 6394
Localities around Beaufort River
Arthur River	Arthur River	Wedgecarrup
Mokup	Beaufort River	Kenmare
Mokup	Boscabel	Boscabel

Beaufort River is a rural locality of the Shire of Woodanilling in the Great Southern region of Western Australia. The Albany Highway runs through the locality from north to south, while the Beaufort River runs forms much of its eastern and northern border. A small southern part of the Beaufort Bridge Nature Reserve is located in the north of the locality.

Beaufort River is located on the traditional land of the Kaniyang people of the Noongar nation.

The Shire of Woodanilling heritage list has 19 entries for the locality, among them the Beaufort Bridge, Beaufort River Tavern and the Beaufort Homestead.

The Beaufort Homestead itself consists of twelve heritage sites and dates back to 1860. It was originally built for early settler William Cornwall, who took out a pastoral lease in the area in 1858. He sold the property and left the area in 1875.
