= Westwood, Western Australia =

Locality in the Shire of Woodanilling, Western Australia

Westwood
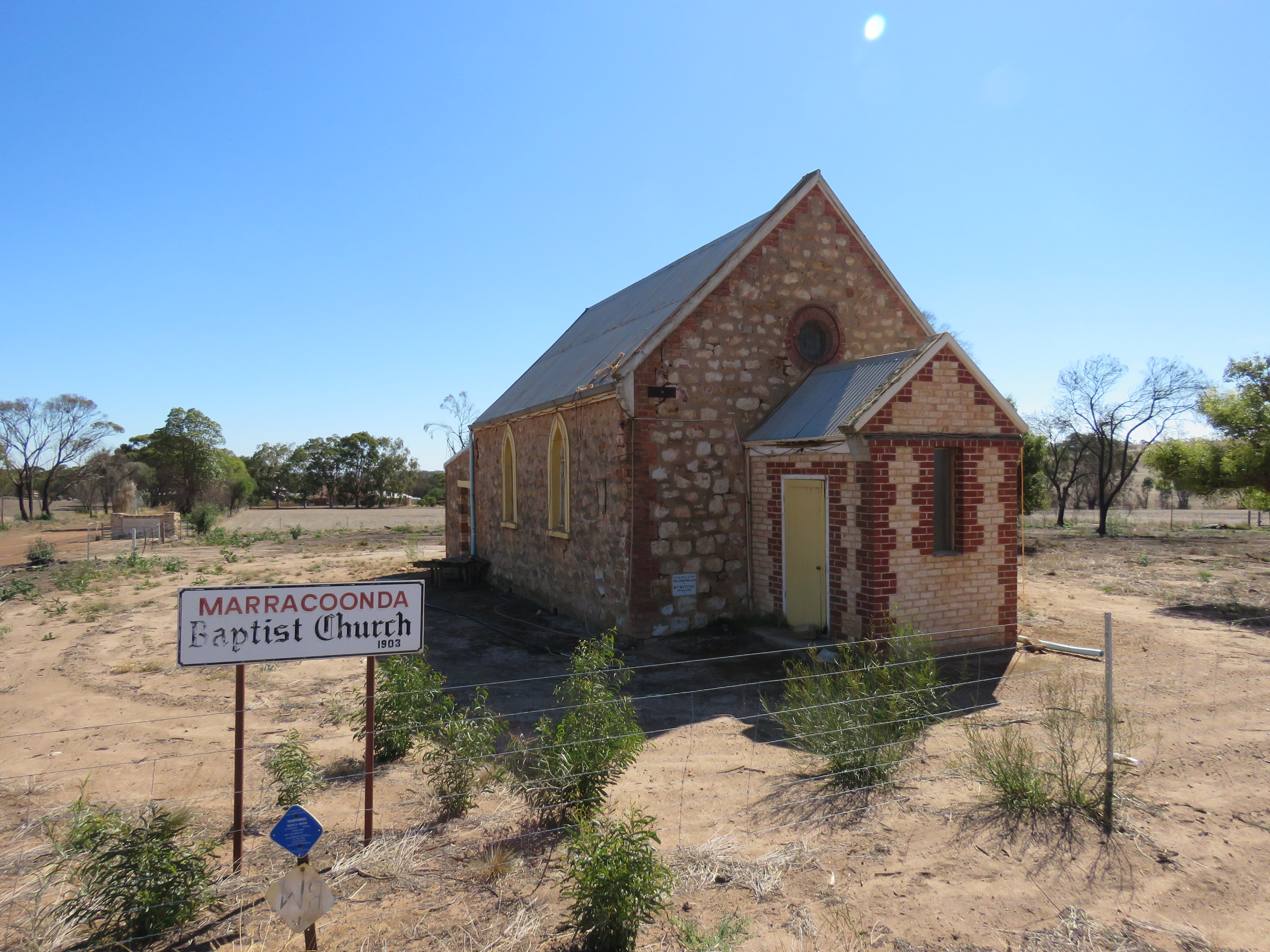
- The heritage listed Marracoonda Baptist Church

- Interactive map of Westwood
- Coordinates: 33.60275°S 117.34205°E
- Country: Australia
- State: Western Australia
- LGA: Shire of Woodanilling
- Location: 227 km (141 mi) SE of Perth; 169 km (105 mi) N of Albany; 10 km (6.2 mi) W of Woodanilling

Government
  - State electorate: Roe
  - Federal division: O'Connor

Area
  - Total: 164.9 km^{2} (63.7 sq mi)

Population
  - Total: 34 (SAL 2021)
- Postcode: 6316
Localities around Westwood
Kenmare	Boyerine	Woodanilling
Kenmare	Westwood	Woodanilling
Cherry Tree Pool	Carrolup	Marracoonda

Westwood is a rural locality of the Shire of Woodanilling in the Great Southern region of Western Australia. The eastern border of the locality is formed by the Great Southern Highway. The Strathmore Hill Nature Reserve is located within Westwood.

== History ==
The Shire of Woodanilling is predominantly located on the traditional land of the Wiilman people, including Westwood, with just the south-west of the shire being on the land of the Kaniyang people, both of the Noongar nation.

The heritage listed Marracoonda Baptist Church, located in the far south-eastern corner of Westwood, on the Great Southern Highway, straddles the border to the neighbouring Shire of Katanning and the locality of Marracoonda. Also located on the Shire of Woodanilling side of the border, it is on the heritage register for both shires, Katanning and Woodanilling, and dates back to 1903.

The site of the Westwood School, in the north-west of the locality, is also listed on the shire's heritage register. It was constructed in 1912 as the Dowlering School and officially opened on 13 April 1913 but moved to the Westwood site in 1918. Typical for small school buildings in the state, attendance rose and fell, and buildings were moved to new locations based on demand. The Westwood School was moved to Boyerine in 1928, after the local teacher at Westwood had left the school to get married, and no replacement was appointed. The seven or eight remaining pupils were moved to different schools nearby in the area. The former school building is now located at the Wagin Historical Village.

== Nature reserve ==
The Strathmore Hill Nature Reserve was gazetted on 5 May 1989, has a size of 1.71 square kilometres (0.66 mi^{2}), and is located within the Avon Wheatbelt bioregion.
