= Marracoonda, Western Australia =

Locality in the Shire of Katanning, Western Australia

Marracoonda
- other
- Coordinates: 33.66694°S 117.46330°E
- Country: Australia
- State: Western Australia
- LGA(s): Shire of Katanning
- Location: 240 km (150 mi) SE of Perth; 157 km (98 mi) N of Albany; 10 km (6.2 mi) NW of Katanning

Government
  - State electorate(s): Roe
  - Federal division(s): O'Connor

Area
  - Total: 57.8 km^{2} (22.3 sq mi)

Population
  - Total(s): 17 (SAL 2021)
- Postcode: 6317
Localities around Marracoonda
Westwood	Woodanilling	Moojebing
Carrolup	Marracoonda	Katanning
Carrolup	Carrolup	Katanning

Marracoonda is a rural locality of the Shire of Katanning in the Great Southern region of Western Australia. The Great Southern Highway runs through the locality from its north-western corner to the eastern border.

Marracoonda is located on the traditional land of the Kaneang people of the Noongar nation.

Despite its name, the heritage listed Marracoonda Baptist Church is located in the far south-eastern corner of Westwood, in the Shire of Woodanilling, on the Great Southern Highway. It straddles the border to the Shire of Katanning and Marracoonda. Also located on the Woodanilling side of the border, it is on the heritage register for both shires, Katanning and Woodanilling, and dates back to 1903.
