= Carrolup, Western Australia =

Locality in the Shire of Katanning, Western Australia

Carrolup
- Interactive map of Carrolup
- Coordinates: 33.68361°S 117.37670°E
- Country: Australia
- State: Western Australia
- LGA: Shire of Katanning
- Location: 247 km (153 mi) SE of Perth; 149 km (93 mi) N of Albany; 12 km (7.5 mi) W of Katanning

Government
  - State electorate: Roe
  - Federal division: O'Connor

Area
  - Total: 167.1 km^{2} (64.5 sq mi)

Population
  - Total: 49 (SAL 2016)
- Postcode: 6317
Localities around Carrolup
Westwood	Westwood	Marracoonda
Cherry Tree Pool	Carrolup	Katanning
Cherry Tree Pool	Broomehill West	Murdong

Carrolup is a rural locality of the Shire of Katanning in the Great Southern region of Western Australia. The small Carrolup Nature Reserve is located within Carrolup, on the Carrolup River, which flows through the locality from east to west.

Carrolup is located on the traditional land of the Kaneang people of the Noongar nation.

The Carrolup Native Settlement, now referred to as Marribank, is listed on the Western Australian State Register of Heritage Places, but, despite its name, is located west of the current locality, on the Carrolup River, in the locality of Cherry Tree Pool in the Shire of Kojonup.

The Carrolup Agricultural Hall, on the shire's heritage register, dates back to 1902 and has served as a church, school a golf club and a pony club.

== Nature reserve ==
The Carrolup Nature Reserve was gazetted on 21 June 1901, has a size of 0.3 square kilometres (0.12 mi^{2}), and is located within the Avon Wheatbelt and Jarrah Forest bioregions.
