= Carrolup =

Carrolup may refer to:

- Carrolup Native Settlement, Western Australia, now known as Marribank
- Carrolup, Western Australia, a locality of the Shire of Katanning
  - Carrolup Nature Reserve, in the locality of Carrolup, Western Australia
- Carrolup River, a river in Western Australia
