= Boyerine, Western Australia =

Locality in the Shire of Woodanilling, Western Australia

Boyerine
- Town
- Interactive map of Boyerine
- Coordinates: 33.49711°S 117.40930°E
- Country: Australia
- State: Western Australia
- LGA: Shire of Woodanilling
- Location: 225 km (140 mi) SE of Perth; 175 km (109 mi) N of Albany; 7 km (4.3 mi) N of Woodanilling

Government
  - State electorate: Roe
  - Federal division: O'Connor

Area
  - Total: 180.8 km^{2} (69.8 sq mi)

Population
  - Total: 38 (SAL 2021)
- Postcode: 6316
Localities around Boyerine
Lime Lake	Lime Lake	Cartmeticup
Wedgecarrup	Boyerine	Cartmeticup
Kenmare	Westwood	Woodanilling

Boyerine is a town and locality of the Shire of Woodanilling in the Great Southern region of Western Australia. The Great Southern Highway and the Great Southern Railway run through the locality from north to south. The Flagstaff Nature Reserve is located at the western border of Boyerine.

== History ==
The Shire of Woodanilling, including Boyerine, is predominantly located on the traditional land of the Wiilman people with just the south-west of the shire being on the land of the Kaniyang people, both of the Noongar nation.

Boyerine was a siding on the Great Southern Railway, operational from 1900 to 1987. Boyerine was not originally gazetted as a stopping place on the railway line and, once established, was predominantly used for freight. A bulk grain handling facility existed at Boyerine from 1959 to 1976. The railway did establish a fenced-in horse paddock for day-travellers to nearby Katanning or Wagin.

A townsite under the name of Boyadine, was gazetted in 1904 and soon after renamed to Boyerine. The name originates from Boyerine Pool, which is thought to be related to Boya, an Aboriginal word meaning "stone" or "rock". Boyerine was the scene of a gold rush in 1908.

The Shire of Woodanilling heritage list has 19 entries for the locality, among them the Boyerine Railway Bridge, the Boyerine Siding site and the Boyerine School site.

The Boyerine school building had a history of relocations, having started out at Dowering, being moved to a different site there before relocating to Westwood and, subsequently, Boyerine. After years of disuse, the building was relocated to the Wagin Historical Society.

The Boyerine railway bridge was the scene of a railway accident in the winter of 1917, in which one person was killed. Excessive rain had washed away some of the embarkment near the bridge, after two passenger and a troop train had passed hours earlier without incident, causing a freight train to derail. The fire man of the train, Chris Peacock, died as soon as rescued from the wreck while the train driver survived despite suffering severe burns.

== Nature reserve ==
The Flagstaff Nature Reserve was gazetted on 4 June 1965, has a size of 4.24 square kilometres (1.64 mi^{2}), and is located within the Avon Wheatbelt bioregion.
