= Kenmare, Western Australia =

Locality in the Shire of Woodanilling, Western Australia

Kenmare
- other
- Coordinates: 33.57083°S 117.18860°E
- Country: Australia
- State: Western Australia
- LGA: Shire of Woodanilling
- Location: 220 km (140 mi) SE of Perth; 173 km (107 mi) N of Albany; 18 km (11 mi) W of Woodanilling

Government
  - State electorate: Roe
  - Federal division: O'Connor

Area
  - Total: 209.1 km^{2} (80.7 sq mi)

Population
  - Total: 36 (SAL 2021)
- Postcode: 6316
Localities around Kenmare
Wedgecarrup	Wedgecarrup	Boyerine
Beaufort River	Kenmare	Westwood
Beaufort River	Boscabel	Cherry Tree Pool

Kenmare is a rural locality of the Shire of Woodanilling in the Great Southern region of Western Australia. The Beaufort River forms much of the western border of the locality, which reaches as far west as Albany Highway in two places. The Martinup, Murapin, Miripin and Wardering Lake Nature Reserves are all located in the north of Kenmare, while the Wingedine Nature Reserve is located in the south.

== History ==
The Shire of Woodanilling, including Kenmare, is predominantly located on the traditional land of the Wiilman people with just the south-west of the shire being on the land of the Kaniyang people, both of the Noongar nation.

The Shire of Woodanilling heritage list has 14 entries for the locality, among them the Kenmare Homestead, the Kenmare School Hall, Kenmare Hall, and a number of lakes, swamps and springs.

Kenmare Homestead dates back to 1900, when Harold Douglas settled in the area and named it after the family farm in Victoria. Douglas farmed at Kenmare until 1952, when he retired and sold the property.

Kenmare School Hall dates back to 1920, when the need for a local school in the area was identified and the local hall was offered for this purpose. The school officially opened on 10 October 1921 but the number of pupils declined, forcing its closure by the end of 1926, reopening a decade later.

== Nature reserves ==
The following five nature reserves are located within Kenmare. All five are located within the Avon Wheatbelt bioregion:

- Martinup Nature Reserve, gazetted 27 September 1918, 0.91 square kilometres (0.35 sq mi)
- Miripin Nature Reserve, gazetted 21 February 1958, 0.28 square kilometres (0.11 sq mi)
- Murapin Nature Reserve, gazetted 4 July 1919, 0.74 square kilometres (0.29 sq mi). Murapin Lake is listed on the shire's heritage list.
- Wardering Lake Nature Reserve, gazetted 4 July 1919, 0.43 square kilometres (0.17 sq mi). Wardering Lake is listed on the shire's heritage list.
- Wingedine Nature Reserve, gazetted 10 March 1967, 2.54 square kilometres (0.98 sq mi)
