= Glencoe, Western Australia =

Locality in the Shire of Woodanilling, Western Australia

Glencoe
- other
- Coordinates: 33.46181°S 117.62512°E
- Country: Australia
- State: Western Australia
- LGA(s): Shire of Woodanilling
- Location: 237 km (147 mi) SE of Perth; 175 km (109 mi) N of Albany; 21 km (13 mi) NE of Woodanilling

Government
  - State electorate(s): Roe
  - Federal division(s): O'Connor

Area
  - Total: 96.7 km^{2} (37.3 sq mi)

Population
  - Total(s): 25 (SAL 2021)
- Postcode: 6316
Localities around Glencoe
Ballaying	Ballaying	Bullock Hills
Cartmeticup	Glencoe	South Glencoe
Moojebing	Moojebing	Moojebing

Glencoe is a rural locality of the Shire of Woodanilling in the Great Southern region of Western Australia.

== History ==
The Shire of Woodanilling, including Glencoe, is predominantly located on the traditional land of the Wiilman people, with just the south-west of the shire being on the land of the Kaniyang people, both of the Noongar nation.

The Shire of Woodanilling heritage list has eight entries for the locality, among them the Yelyelling Homestead as well as the sites of the Glencoe House, Glencoe School and Glencoe Post Office.

Glencoe House and property, a farm, was established in 1874 by early settler Michael Cronin, who came into the area in the 1860s and died at the house in 1931. The building no longer exists. Cronin was a founding member of the Katanning Road Board and the name of his property was used as a name for the wider area, with the local oval, rifle range and school all being named after it. His house also became the unofficial post office for outlying properties in areas not serviced by mail deliveries.

A school was established at Glencoe at the request of prominent local settlers and opened in May 1908. By 1911, the number of pupils at the school had dropped to a level that permitted schooling only on alternate weeks, with one teacher shared between two local schools, Woolkabin and Glencoe. Woolkabin school closed in 1916 and Glencoe received a full time teacher again. It was temporarily closed in 1927 when pupil numbers dropped too low, but was reopened until its final closure in 1944. The building was then sold to the Baptist Church, which used it for church services until 1968. It was subsequently moved south, to Torbay, to a Baptist holiday camp and only the site of the former school now remains at Glencoe.

Yelyelling Homestead was built by William Cronin, eldest son of Michael Cronin, in 1902.
