= Pinwernying, Western Australia =

Town in the Shire of Katanning, Western Australia

Pinwernying
- Town
- Coordinates: 33.66583°S 117.54060°E
- Country: Australia
- State: Western Australia
- LGA(s): Shire of Katanning
- Location: 248 km (154 mi) SE of Perth; 154 km (96 mi) N of Albany; 3 km (1.9 mi) S of Katanning
- Established: 1892

Government
  - State electorate(s): Roe
  - Federal division(s): O'Connor

Area
  - Total: 5.4 km^{2} (2.1 sq mi)

Population
  - Total(s): 97 (SAL 2021)
- Postcode: 6317
Localities around Pinwernying
Moojebing	Moojebing	Katanning
Katanning	Pinwernying	Katanning
Katanning	Katanning	Katanning

Pinwernying is a town and locality of the Shire of Katanning in the Great Southern region of Western Australia, adjacent to Katanning. The Great Southern Railway forms the western border of the locality.

== History ==
Pinwernying is at the border of the traditional land of the Koreng and Kaneang peoples, both of the Noongar nation.

While Katanning, in its early days, was a private townsite and owned by the Western Australian Land Company, the state government reserved land nearby at what would become the townsite of Pinwernying. Pinwernying was gazetted in 1892 and is named after Pinwernying Soak, the indigenous name of a nearby water source. Pinwernying Soak was recorded by a surveyor in 1887, but the meaning of the name is unknown.

The heritage listed Great Southern Railway Memorial is located on the Pinwernying side of the railway line and dates back to 1939, to the fiftieth anniversary of the opening of the line in 1889.
