= Pterostylis picta =

Painted rufous greenhood

Scientific classification
- Kingdom: Plantae
- Clade: Tracheophytes
- Clade: Angiosperms
- Clade: Monocots
- Order: Asparagales
- Family: Orchidaceae
- Subfamily: Orchidoideae
- Tribe: Cranichideae
- Genus: Pterostylis
- Species: P. picta

Binomial name
- Pterostylis picta M.A.Clem.

Synonyms
- Oligochaetochilus picta Szlach. orth. var.; Oligochaetochilus pictus (M.A.Clem.) Szlach.; Pterostylis picta D.L.Jones nom. inval.

Species of orchid

Pterostylis picta, commonly known as the painted rufous greenhood or painted rustyhood is a plant in the orchid family Orchidaceae and is endemic to the south-west of Western Australia. Both flowering and non-flowering plants have a relatively large rosette of leaves. Flowering plants also have up to seven large translucent white flowers with green and brown stripes and markings and a fleshy, insect-like labellum.

== Description ==
Pterostylis picta is a terrestrial, perennial, deciduous, herb with an underground tuber and a rosette of between six and twelve leaves. The leaves are 15–45 mm (0.6–2 in) long and 7–20 mm (0.3–0.8 in) wide. Flowering plants have a rosette at the base of the flowering stem but the leaves are usually withered by flowering time. Up to seven or more translucent white flowers with green and brown stripes and markings and 30–35 mm (1.2–1.4 in) long and 7–9 mm (0.28–0.35 in) wide are borne on a flowering spike 150–500 mm (6–20 in) tall. The dorsal sepal and petals form a hood or "galea" over the column with the dorsal sepal having a narrow tip 6–7 mm (0.2–0.3 in) long. The lateral sepals turn downwards, about the same width as the galea and suddenly taper to narrow tips 10–13 mm (0.4–0.5 in) long which turn forward and spread apart from each other. The labellum is brown, thick, fleshy and insect-like, 5–6 mm (0.20–0.24 in) long, about 2 mm (0.08 in) wide and covered with short hairs with longer hairs on the edges. Flowering occurs from September to November.

== Taxonomy and naming ==
Pterostylis picta was first formally described in 1989 by Mark Clements from a specimen collected near Moora and the description was published in Australian Orchid Research. The specific epithet (picta) is a Latin word meaning "painted" or "coloured" referring to the markings on the flowers.

== Distribution and habitat ==
The painted rufous greenhood grows in woodland, shrubland and in shallow soil on granite outcrops between Kalbarri and Woodanilling.

== Conservation ==
Pterostylis picta is classified as "not threatened" by the Western Australian Government Department of Parks and Wildlife.
