= Glencoe High School =

Glencoe High School may refer to:

- Glencoe High School (Alabama), Glencoe, Alabama
- Glencoe High School (Minnesota), Glencoe, Minnesota
- Glencoe High School (Oklahoma), Glencoe, Oklahoma
- Glencoe High School (Hillsboro, Oregon), Hillsboro, Oregon
- Glencoe District High School, Glencoe, Ontario
