= Glencoe Public Schools (Oklahoma) =

School district in Oklahoma

Location
- 201 East Lone Chimney Road; Glencoe, Oklahoma 74032 Payne County United States

District information
- Type: Public, Primary, Secondary, Co-Educational
- Motto: Home of the Panthers
- Grades: Elementary PK-8; High School 9-12
- Superintendent: Jay Reeves
- Schools: 2

Students and staff
- Students: 359 (2018-19)
- Teachers: 19.86 (FTE)
- Athletic conference: 1A

Other information
- Website: www.glencoe.k12.ok.us/o/glencoe-ps

The Glencoe Public School District is located in Glencoe, Oklahoma, United States. The Glencoe school district has two schools.

The district is managed by Superintendent Jay Reeves, who works under the direction of a five-person board.

The mascot of both the district and the high school is the Panther.

== Schools ==
=== High school ===
- Glencoe High School (Grades 9-12)

=== Elementary school ===
- 7th and 8th grade are considered part of the elementary school.
- Glencoe Elementary School (Grades PK-8)
