= Pterostylis macrocalymma =

Large-hooded rufous greenhood

Conservation status
- Priority One — Poorly Known Taxa (DEC)

Scientific classification
- Kingdom: Plantae
- Clade: Tracheophytes
- Clade: Angiosperms
- Clade: Monocots
- Order: Asparagales
- Family: Orchidaceae
- Subfamily: Orchidoideae
- Tribe: Cranichideae
- Genus: Pterostylis
- Species: P. macrocalymma

Binomial name
- Pterostylis macrocalymma M.A.Clem. & D.L.Jones

Synonyms
- Oligochaetochilus macrocalymmus (M.A.Clem. & D.L.Jones) Szlach.

Species of orchid

Pterostylis macrocalymma, commonly known as the large-hooded rufous greenhood or Murchison rustyhood is a plant in the orchid family Orchidaceae and is endemic to the south-west of Western Australia. Both flowering and non-flowering plants have a relatively large rosette of leaves. Flowering plants also have up to ten or more white flowers with bold green or pale brown lines and a broad spoon-shaped, insect-like labellum.

== Description ==
Pterostylis macrocalymma is a terrestrial, perennial, deciduous, herb with an underground tuber and a rosette of between six and ten leaves. The leaves are 20–60 mm (0.8–2 in) long and 8–16 mm (0.3–0.6 in) wide. Flowering plants have a rosette at the base of the flowering stem but the leaves are usually withered by flowering time. Up to ten or more translucent white flowers with bold pale green or brown lines are borne on a flowering stem 100–250 mm (4–10 in) tall. The flowers lean forward and are 25–28 mm (0.98–1.1 in) long and 10–12 mm (0.4–0.5 in) wide. The dorsal sepal and petals form a hood or "galea" over the column with the dorsal sepal having a narrow tip 8–18 mm (0.3–0.7 in) long. The lateral sepals turn downwards and are the same width as the galea, deeply dished and suddenly taper to narrow tips 20–25 mm (0.8–1 in) long which turn forward and spread apart from each other. The labellum is fleshy, dark brown and insect-like, 7–9 mm (0.3–0.4 in) long, about 4 mm (0.2 in) wide with short hairs on the "head" end and five to eight long hairs on each side of the "body". Flowering occurs from August to early October.

== Taxonomy and naming ==
Pterostylis macrocalymma was first formally described in 1989 by Mark Clements and David Jones from a specimen collected near where the North West Coastal Highway crosses the Murchison River. The description was published in Australian Orchid Research. The specific epithet (macrocalymma) is derived from the Ancient Greek words makros meaning "long" and kalymma meaning "a covering", "hood" or "veil" referring to the large galea of this orchid.

== Distribution and habitat ==
The large-hooded rufous greenhood grows in woodland and shrubland and on granite outcrops between Moora, Woodanilling and Esperance in the Geraldton Sandplains biogeographic region.

== Conservation ==
Pterostylis macrocalymma is classified as "Priority One" by the Western Australian Government Department of Parks and Wildlife, meaning that it is known from only one or a few locations which are potentially at risk.
