= Glencoe station (disambiguation) =

Glencoe station is a railway station in Glencoe, Illinois, United States.

Glencoe station may also refer to:

- Glencoe station (Ontario), a railway station in Glencoe, Ontario, Canada
- Glencoe station, a closed railway station in Glencoe, New South Wales, Australia
- Glencoe Station, a pastoral lease in Queensland, Australia
