= Glencoe, Nova Scotia =

Glencoe, Nova Scotia may refer to the following places:

- Glencoe, Guysborough County, Nova Scotia
- Glencoe, Inverness County, Nova Scotia
- Glencoe, Pictou County, Nova Scotia

== See also ==
- Glencoe (disambiguation)
