= Kojonup Reserve =

Protected area in Western Australia

- Location within Western Australia
- Location: Western Australia
- Nearest city: Kojonup, Western Australia
- Coordinates: 33.6766°S 117.2291°E
- Area: 3.92 km^{2} (1.51 sq mi)
- Established: 1996
- Governing body: Bush Heritage Australia
- Website: Official website

Kojonup Reserve is a 392-hectare (970-acre) nature reserve in south-west Western Australia. It is 30 kilometres (19 mi) north-east of Kojonup, 196 kilometres (122 mi) north-west of Albany and 270 kilometres (170 mi) south-east of Perth. It is owned and managed by Bush Heritage Australia, by which it was purchased in 1996.

Located in Cherry Tree Pool, in the Shire of Kojonup, it borders the Birdwood Nature Reserve to the south-west.

== Flora and fauna ==
The reserve protects one of the few remaining remnants of wandoo woodland in the south-west of the state. Mammals recorded from the reserve include the western grey kangaroo, common brushtail possum and western brush wallaby. Many woodland birds have been recorded, including scarlet, red-capped and western yellow robins, jacky winter and regent parrot.
