= Revel Cooper =

- Born: Revel Ronald Cooper c. 1934; Katanning, Western Australia
- Died: 1983 (aged 48–49); Melbourne, Australia
- Known for: Painting
- Movement: Carrolup
- Patrons: Florence Rutter

Revel Ronald Cooper (c. 1934 – 1983) was an Indigenous Australian artist. He was a prominent member of a Noongar art movement that emerged among children living at Carrolup Native Settlement during the late 1940s and early 1950s.

== Early life ==
Cooper was born in Katanning, Western Australia in the mid-1930s and as a ward of the state was placed at Carrolup Native Settlement.

== Children of Carrolup ==
From the 1940s children at the Carrolup school were given specialised art training. Cooper was one of a number of children collectively referred to as the Children of Carrolup. During the late 1940s artwork created by the Carrolup children was exhibited in the Western Australian capital Perth and overseas in India. Through the intervention of English woman Florence Rutter, the paintings were exhibited in New Zealand and in Europe. In 1952 his work appeared in Mary Durack's book Child Artists of the Australian Bush.

== Later art ==
Unlike many of the child artists of Carrolup, Cooper continued painting into adulthood. After leaving school in 1951 he was briefly engaged as a commercial artist in Perth before moving back to Carrolup to work as a farm worker and railway fettler.

In 1952 Cooper was tried for the murder of Jimmy Dee Long near Narrogin, but the jury was discharged after failing to reach a verdict. Later that year he was tried and found guilty of the lesser crime of manslaughter. The jury strongly recommended mercy, and the judge told Cooper that alcohol "is the source of your trouble" and sentenced him to four years imprisonment. This was the first of a string of jail terms.

In the mid-1950s he had a brief stint in Victoria working for Bill Onus' Aboriginal souvenir business and is considered to have influenced the artistic style of Bill's son, Lin Onus.

During the 1960s with assistance from the Victorian Aborigines Advancement League Cooper was a frequent exhibitor in Victorian galleries. His use of landscapes had by this stage become his signature style.

In 1968 Cooper wrote an article "To Regain Our Pride", for the Aboriginal Quarterly. Writing from prison in Geelong, he described his childhood dreams and later disillusionment.

During a stint in Fremantle Prison in 1976 he was the illustrator of Mary Durack's Yagan of the Bibbulmun, a work of juvenile fiction. While at Fremantle he also painted twelve works depicting the Stations of the Cross (now lost) for the restoration of the Sacred Heart Church in Mount Barker. He served as a teacher for a group of artists at Fremantle Prison including Goldie Kelly and Swag Taylor.

For a time he also worked as chauffeur to the Director of Aboriginal Welfare in Melbourne.

== Death and legacy ==
He died in early 1983 after being attacked with a blunt instrument. His body was discovered in December 1985 and he was buried in January 1987.

Cooper's works are found in a number of collections, including the National Gallery of Australia, Art Gallery of Western Australia, the Picker Gallery at Colgate University, Holmes à Court Gallery, Fremantle Prison, and the Berndt Museum of Anthropology.

== Bibliography ==
- Durack, Mary (1976). Yagan of the Bibbulmun. West Melbourne, Victoria: Thomas Nelson (Australia) Limited. ISBN 0-17-001996-9.
