= Glencoe High School (Oklahoma) =

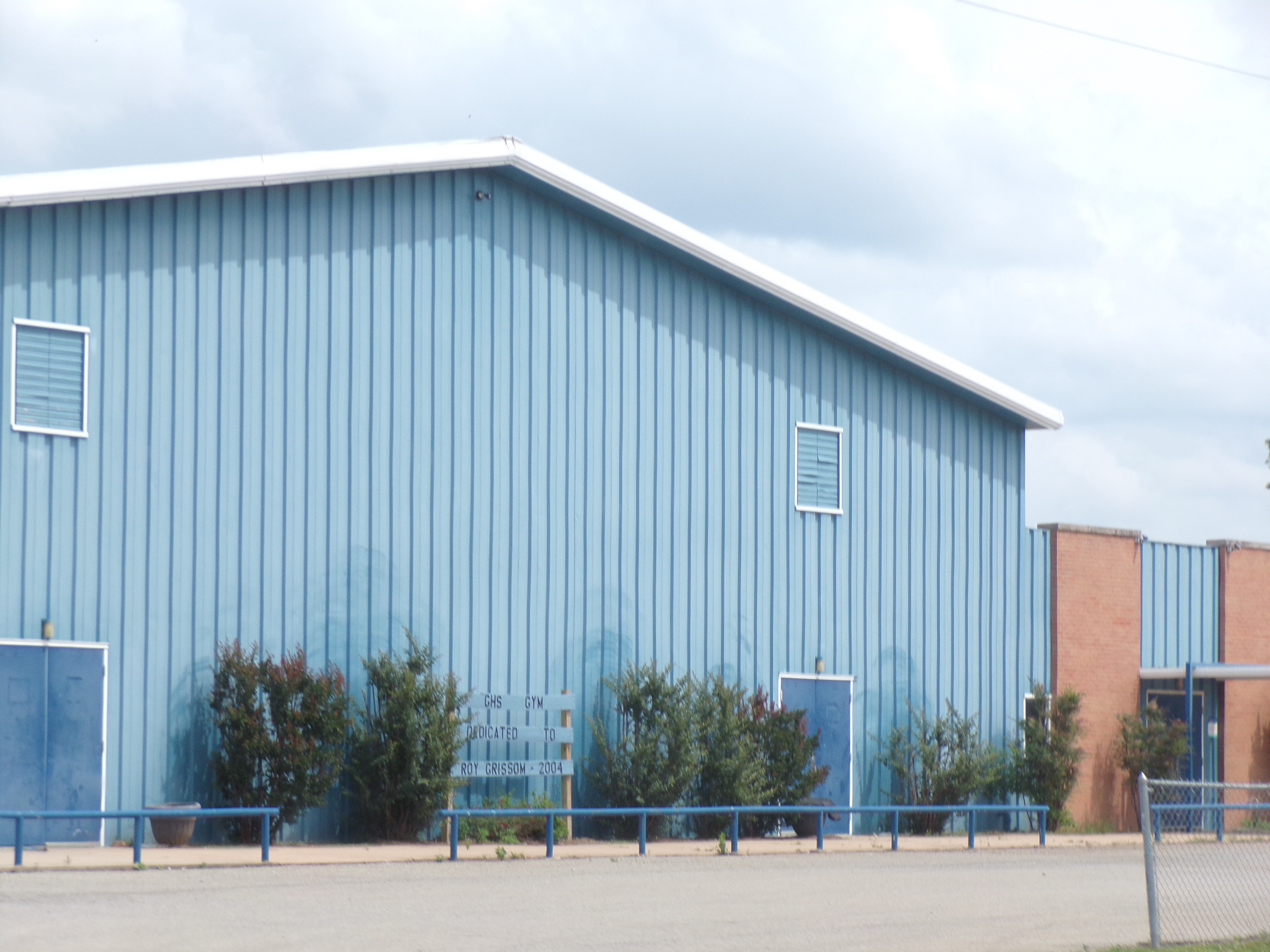

Location
- 201 East Lone Chimney Road; Glencoe, Oklahoma 74032; United States; 36.2315°N 96.9235°W

Information
- Type: Public, secondary school
- School district: Glencoe Public Schools
- Principal: Brady Maxwell
- Teaching staff: 7.43 (FTE)
- Grades: 9-12
- Gender: Co-educational
- Enrollment: 106 (2023-2024)
- Student to teacher ratio: 14.27
- Colors: Blue and Gold
- Athletics conference: OSSAA Class 1A
- Mascot: Panther
- Website: Glencoe Public Schools

Glencoe High School is a public secondary school in Glencoe, Oklahoma, United States. It is located at 201 East Lone Chimney Road in Glencoe, Oklahoma and the only high school in Glencoe Public Schools.

== Extracurricular activities ==
=== Athletics ===
- Baseball
- Basketball
- Softball
