= Cherry Tree Pool, Western Australia =

Locality in the Shire of Kojonup, Western Australia

Cherry Tree Pool
- Interactive map of Cherry Tree Pool
- Coordinates: 33.72944°S 117.25750°E
- Country: Australia
- State: Western Australia
- LGA: Shire of Kojonup
- Location: 230 km (140 mi) SE of Perth; 163 km (101 mi) NW of Albany; 21 km (13 mi) NE of Kojonup

Government
  - State electorate: Roe
  - Federal division: O'Connor

Area
  - Total: 257.9 km^{2} (99.6 sq mi)

Population
  - Total: 72 (SAL 2021)
- Postcode: 6395
Localities around Cherry Tree Pool
Kenmare	Westwood	Westwood
Boscabel	Cherry Tree Pool	Carrolup
Kojonup	Kojonup	Broomehill West

Cherry Tree Pool is a rural locality of the Shire of Kojonup in the Great Southern region of Western Australia. The Carrolup River forms much of its northern border. The Birdwood and Cherry Tree Pool Nature Reserves and the Kojonup Reserve are located within Cherry Tree Pool, as is an unnamed nature reserve.

== History ==
Cherry Tree Pool and the Shire of Kojonup are located on the traditional land of the Kaniyang people of the Noongar nation.

The Carrolup Native Settlement, now referred to as Marribank, is listed on the Western Australian State Register of Heritage Places, and, despite its name, is located west of Carrolup, in Cherry Tree Pool.

The Hollywood House, also called Evelyn Farm, is listed on the shire's heritage list and dates back to 1907.

== Nature reserves ==
The Birdwood Nature Reserve was gazetted on 18 February 1966 and has a size of 0.46 square kilometres (0.18 mi^{2}). The Cherry Tree Pool Nature Reserve was gazetted on 21 July 1905 and has a size of 0.06 square kilometres (0.023 mi^{2}). The unnamed WA05796 Nature Reserve was gazetted on 31 March 1899 and has a size of 0.41 square kilometres (0.16 mi^{2}). All three are located within the Jarrah Forest bioregion.
