= Qikiqtaalujjuaq =

Island in Nunavut, Canada

- Location within Nunavut Location within Canada

Geography
- Location: Hudson Strait
- Coordinates: 63°04′N 71°28′W
- Archipelago: Arctic Archipelago
- Area: 6 km^{2} (2.3 sq mi)

Administration
- Canada
- Nunavut: Nunavut
- Region: Qikiqtaaluk

Demographics
- Population: Uninhabited

Qikiqtaalujjuaq (Inuktitut syllabics: ᕿᑭᖅᑖᓗᔾᔪᐊᖅ) formerly Glencoe Island is a Canadian Arctic island located in Hudson Strait. It is a Baffin Island offshore island in Nunavut's Qikiqtaaluk Region.

The Strathcona Islands and Spicer Islands are close by. Kimmirut, an Inuit hamlet, is to the east.
