= Glencoe (Glencoe, Maryland) =

Historic house in Maryland, United States

- U.S. National Register of Historic Places
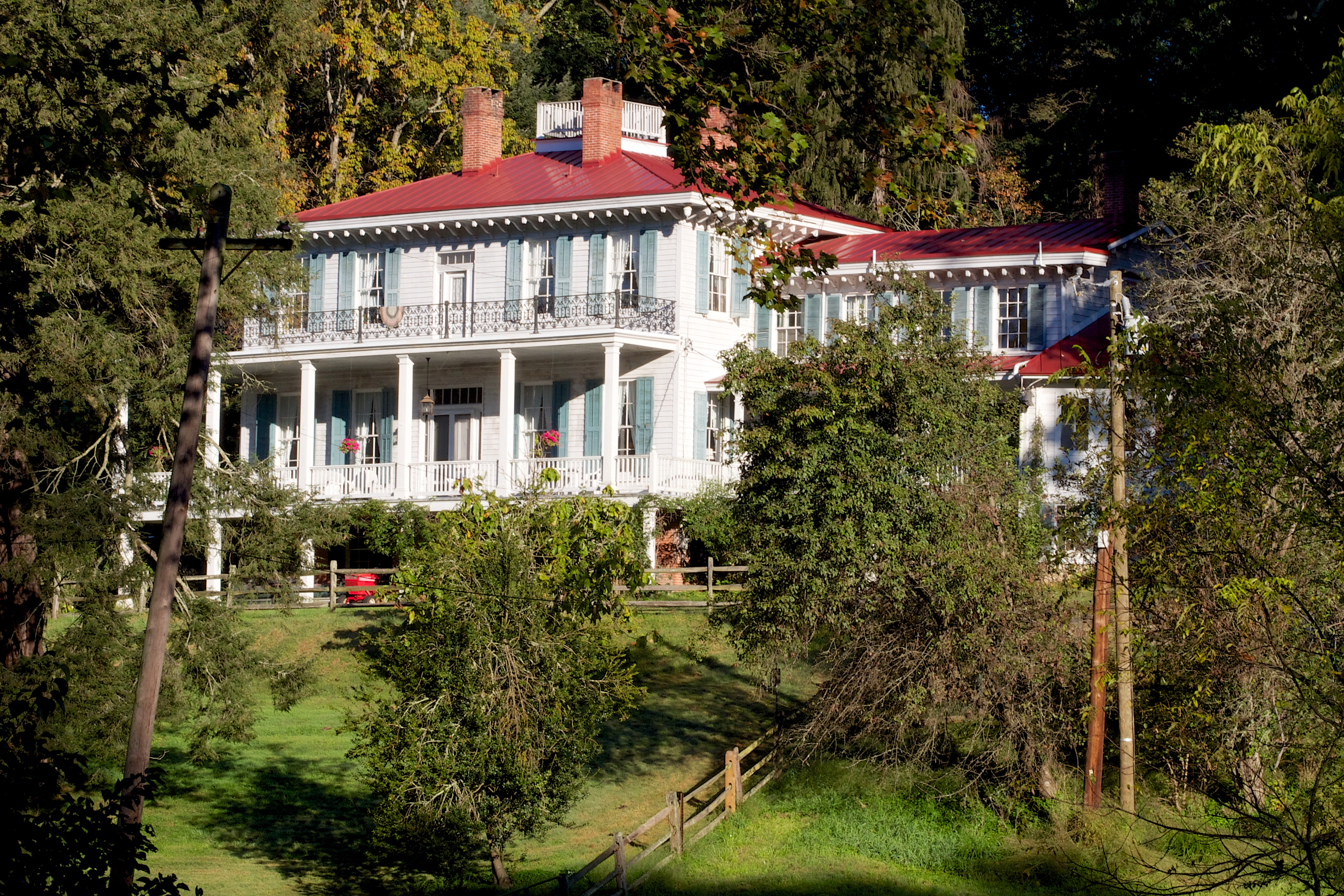
- Glencoe House taken September 25, 2012

- Location within Maryland Location within the United States
- Location: 1314 Glencoe Rd., Glencoe, Maryland
- Coordinates: 39°33′4″N 76°38′6″W
- Area: 4 acres (1.6 ha)
- Built: 1851
- Architectural style: Italianate
- NRHP reference No.: 83002942
- Added to NRHP: May 9, 1983

Glencoe is a historic home and resort complex located at Glencoe, Baltimore County, Maryland. It consists if a complex of Italianate-influenced domestic buildings and structures, clustered around a square, two-story frame dwelling. The house features a broad porch, which wraps around two sides with an iron-railed deck atop the porch. Four interior brick chimneys rise around a central observation deck. The property also includes a two-story, mansard roofed stable / carriage house, a smokehouse, ice house, sheep shed, garden house (probably a former chicken house), and a latticed frame gazebo. It was built in 1851-1856 as a private residence, but was subsequently developed as a summer resort.

It was listed on the National Register of Historic Places in 1983.

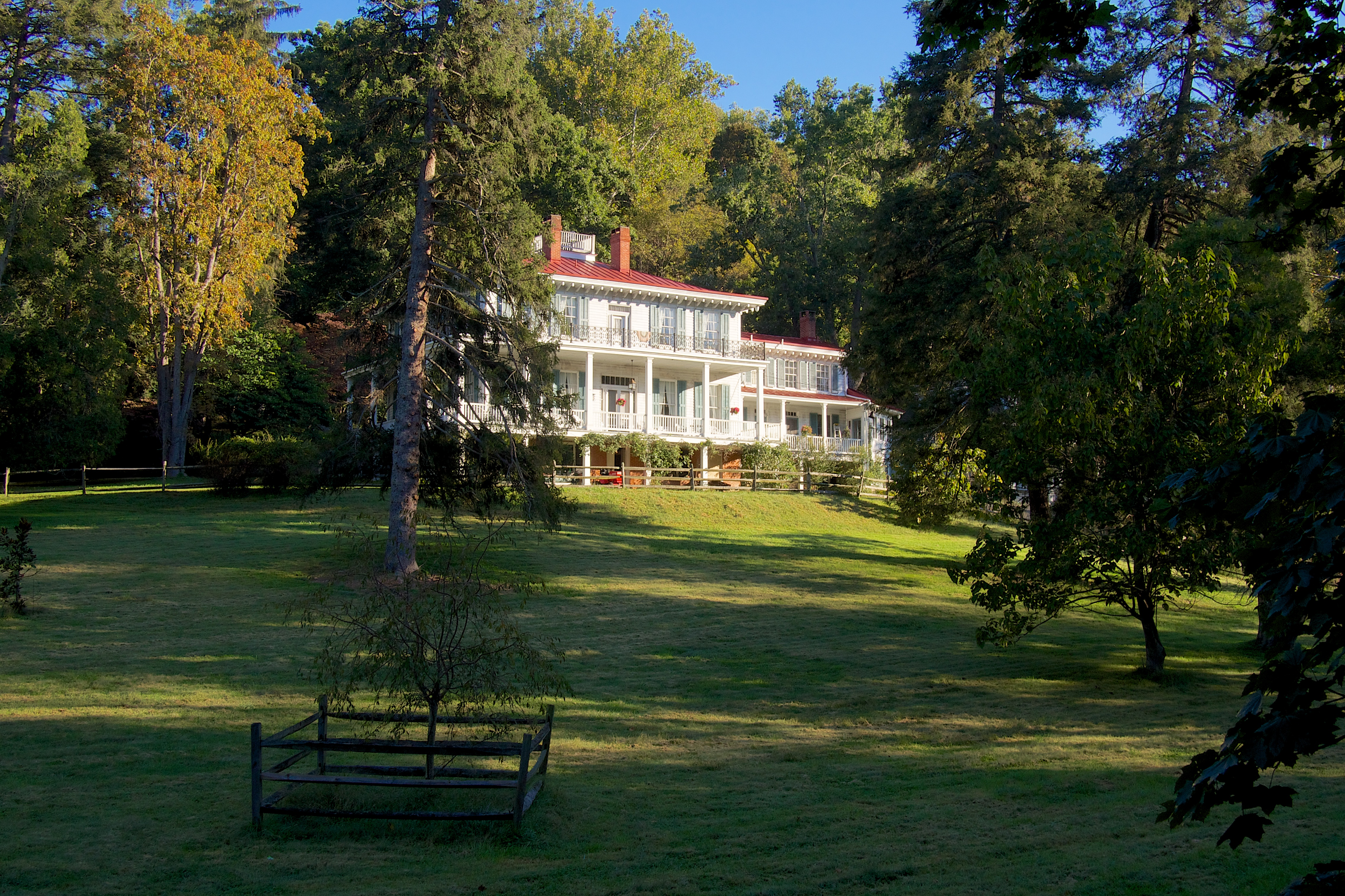
Exterior of Glencoe House Taken From Front Driveway

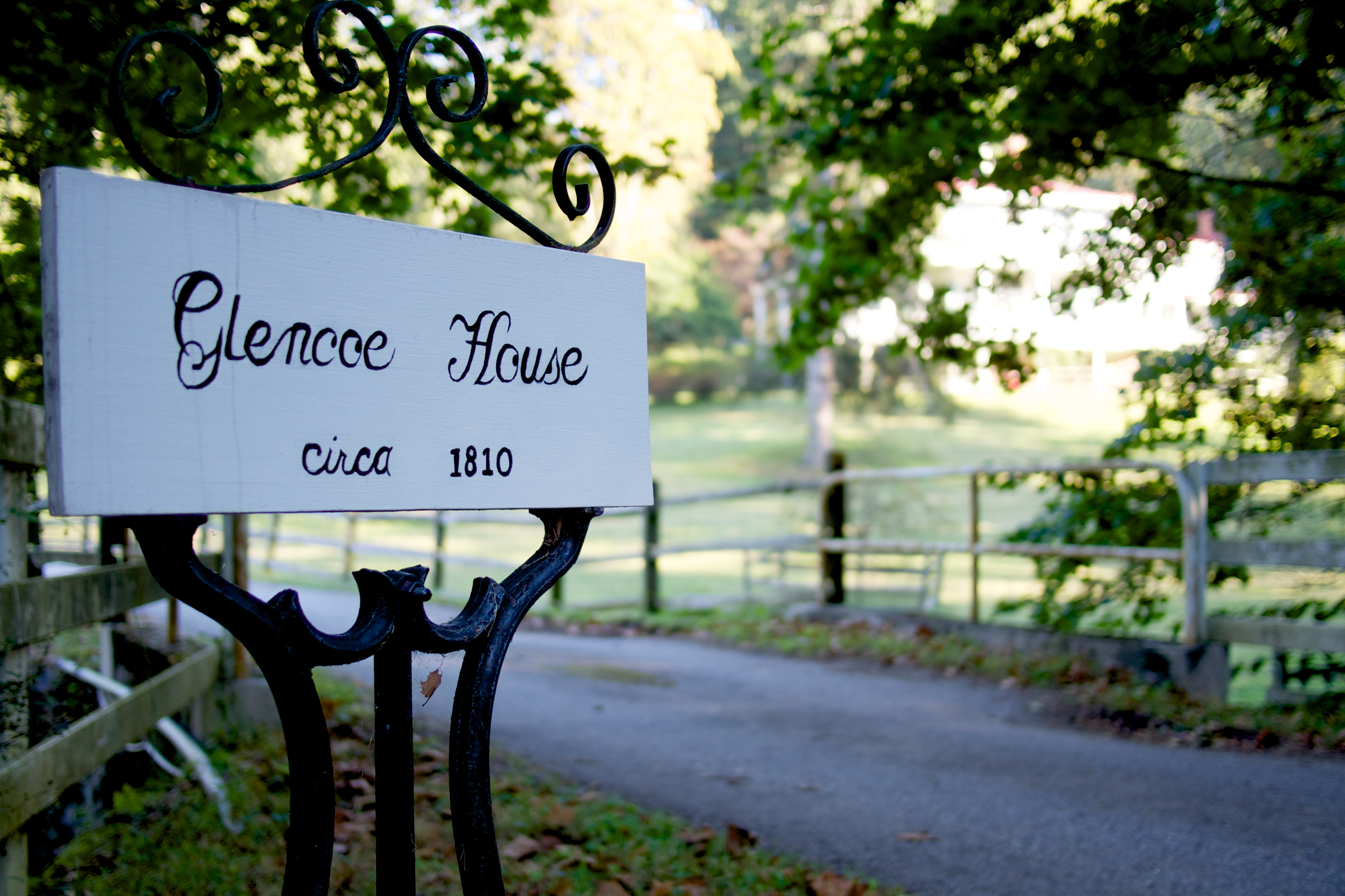
Sign in front of Glencoe House, Circa 1810
