= Glencoe Museum =

Historic house in Virginia, United States

- Glencoe
- U.S. National Register of Historic Places
- Virginia Landmarks Register
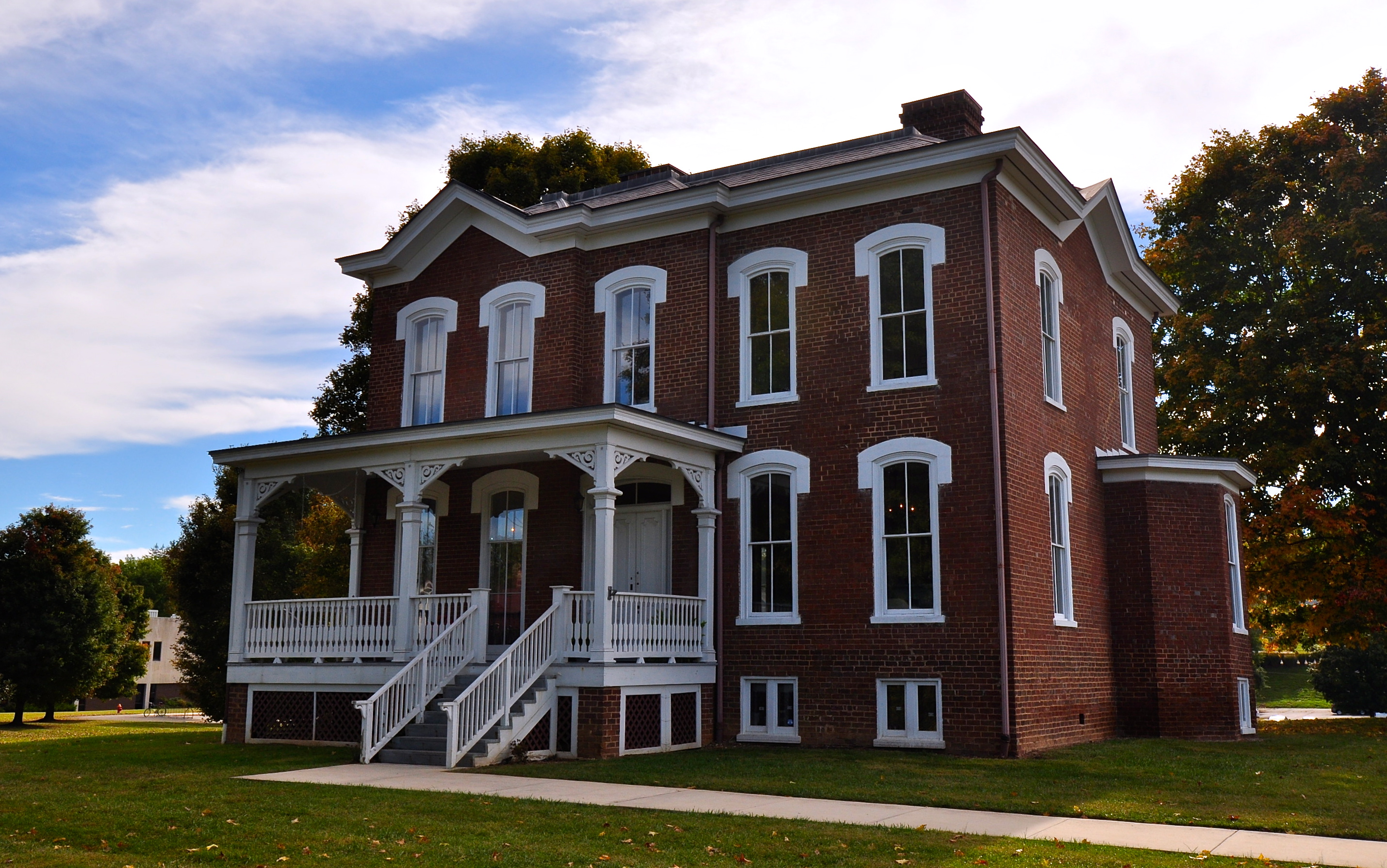
- Glencoe, October 2013

- Location within Virginia Location within the United States
- Location: First St., Radford, Virginia
- Coordinates: 37°7′56″N 80°34′50″W
- Area: 2.1 acres (0.85 ha)
- Built: 1875
- Architectural style: Second Empire
- NRHP reference No.: 00001439
- VLR No.: 126-0045

Significant dates
- Added to NRHP: November 22, 2000
- Designated VLR: September 15, 1999

Glencoe Museum is located in a Victorian house in west downtown Radford, Virginia. The house was built in the 1870s in the 19th-century Victorian style, specifically Second Empire, and was the home of Confederate Brigadier General Gabriel C. Wharton. It is a large, two-story, five-bay, brick dwelling, and originally had quite extensive grounds. The original house had a barn, chicken coop, smoke house, and an ice house.

The name Glencoe is thought to be inspired by Anne Wharton's ancestry. Her family was originally from Scotland.

The house did not appear on Radford's tax records until 1876; it took a very long time to build a house of its size and grandeur in the 1800s. The house was kept in the family until 1996 when, after being deserted for 30 years, it was given to the city of Radford.

The house features some Victorian-period rooms and displays about Radford's history, including Native American artifacts, early settlers, Mary Draper Ingles, local industries, railroads, river transportation, educational institutions and local sports. There is also an art gallery with changing exhibits of the art and works of contemporary Appalachian artists.

Glencoe was listed on the National Register of Historic Places in 2000.
