= Shire of Woodanilling =

Area in Western Australia

Coordinates: 33°33′50″S 117°25′55″E

- Local government area
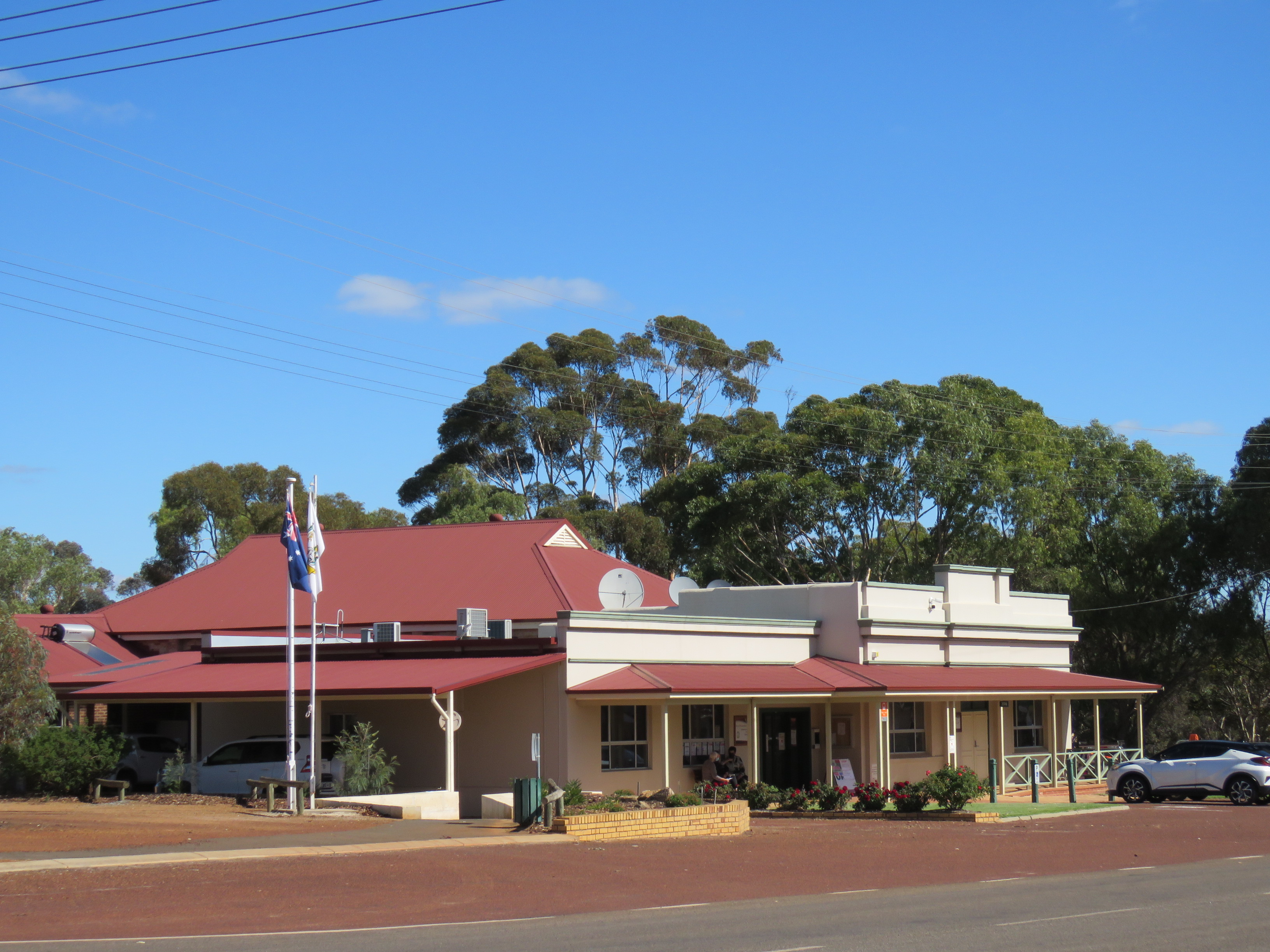
- The Woodanilling shire offices in April 2022

- Interactive map of Shire of Woodanilling
- Country: Australia
- State: Western Australia
- Region: Great Southern
- Council seat: Woodanilling

Government
  - Shire President: Russel Thomson
  - State electorate: Roe
  - Federal division: O'Connor

Area
  - Total: 1,129.0 km^{2} (435.9 sq mi)

Population
  - Total: 448 (LGA 2021)
- Website: Shire of Woodanilling
LGAs around Shire of Woodanilling
West Arthur	Wagin	Dumbleyung
West Arthur	Shire of Woodanilling	Katanning
Kojonup	Kojonup	Katanning

The Shire of Woodanilling is a local government area in the Great Southern region of Western Australia, about 30 kilometres (19 mi) south of Wagin and about 260 kilometres (162 mi) south-southeast of the state capital, Perth. The Shire covers an area of 1,129 square kilometres (436 sq mi), and its seat of government is the town of Woodanilling.

== History ==
The Woodanilling Road District was established on 2 February 1906. On 1 July 1961, it became a Shire under the Local Government Act 1960, which reformed all road districts into shires.

== Indigenous people ==
The south-western part of the Shire of Woodanilling is located on the traditional land of the Kaniyang people while the majority of the shire is on the traditional land of the Wiilman people, both of the Noongar nation.

== Wards ==
The shire is divided into 3 wards:

- Central Ward (2 councillors)
- West Ward (3 councillors)
- East Ward (2 councillors)

== Towns and localities ==
The towns and localities of the Shire of Woodanilling with population and size figures based on the most recent Australian census:

Locality	Population	Area	Map
Beaufort River	54 (SAL 2021)	172.5 km^{2} (66.6 sq mi)	
Boyerine	38 (SAL 2021)	180.8 km^{2} (69.8 sq mi)	
Cartmeticup	57 (SAL 2021)	215.6 km^{2} (83.2 sq mi)	
Glencoe	25 (SAL 2021)	96.7 km^{2} (37.3 sq mi)	
Kenmare	36 (SAL 2021)	209.1 km^{2} (80.7 sq mi)	
Westwood	34 (SAL 2021)	164.9 km^{2} (63.7 sq mi)	
Woodanilling	207 (SAL 2021)	89.5 km^{2} (34.6 sq mi)	

== Population ==
Historical population of the shire:

Historical population

Year	Pop.	±% p.a.
1911	614	—
1921	639	+0.40%
1933	671	+0.41%
1947	697	+0.27%
1954	718	+0.42%
1961	639	−1.65%
1966	580	−1.92%
1971	529	−1.82%
1976	447	−3.31%

Year	Pop.	±% p.a.
1981	461	+0.62%
1986	435	−1.15%
1991	391	−2.11%
1996	354	−1.97%
2001	394	+2.16%
2006	418	+1.19%
2011	419	+0.05%
2016	409	−0.48%
2021	448	+1.84%

== Heritage-listed places ==
As of 2023, 224 places are heritage-listed in the Shire of Woodanilling, of which one is on the State Register of Heritage Places, the Carrolup Aboriginal Cemetery in Marribank. The cemetery is part of the also state heritage listed Carrolup Native Settlement, which was state heritage listed on 22 May 2007 but is predominantly located in the neighbouring Shire of Kojonup.
