= Strathcona Islands =

Island group in Nunavut, Canada

- Location in Nunavut Strathcona Islands (Canada)

Geography
- Location: Hudson Strait
- Coordinates: 63.02°N 71.41°W
- Archipelago: Arctic Archipelago
- Area: 11 km^{2} (4.2 sq mi)
- Highest point: 183 m (600 ft)

Administration
- Canada
- Territory: Nunavut
- Region: Qikiqtaaluk

Demographics
- Population: Uninhabited
- Source: Strathcona Islands at Atlas of Canada

The Strathcona Islands are uninhabited Canadian arctic islands located in Hudson Strait, Nunavut, Canada. They are a Baffin Island offshore island group in Qikiqtaaluk Region lying from 2 mi (3.2 km) to 9 mi (14 km) west of Cape Colmer. The group consists of a large island that rises in a series of rocky ridges to 183 m (600 ft); its south side is low and irregular. There are also several small, rocky islands.

Kimmirut, an Inuit hamlet, is to the east.
