= Glencoe, Maryland =

Unincorporated community in Maryland, United States

- Unincorporated community
- Location within the State of Maryland Glencoe, Maryland (the United States)
- Coordinates: 39°32′56″N 76°38′07″W
- Country: United States
- State: Maryland
- County: Baltimore
- Time zone: UTC-5 (Eastern (EST))
  - Summer (DST): UTC-4 (EDT)

Glencoe is an unincorporated community in Baltimore County, Maryland, United States. Glencoe was listed on the National Register of Historic Places in 1983.
