= Beaufort River =

River in Western Australia

Coordinates: 33°31′S 116°50′E

Location
- Country: Australia

Physical characteristics
- Source
  - location: west of Woodanilling
  - elevation: 262 metres (860 ft)
- Mouth
  - location: Arthur River
  - elevation: 228 metres (748 ft)
- Length: 80 km (50 mi)
- Basin size: 1,565 km^{2} (604 sq mi)
- Discharge
  - average: 23,277 ML/a (26.048 cu ft/s)

The Beaufort River is a river in the South West region of Western Australia.

The river was named in 1835 by John Septimus Roe, Surveyor General of Western Australia, after a friend Rear Admiral Sir Francis Beaufort who was Hydrographer of the Navy from 1829 to 1855.

The river has its headwaters west of Woodanilling near Melbourne Vale and flows in a westerly direction until it flows into the Arthur River near Duranillin. The Arthur River is a tributary of the Blackwood River.

The only tributary of the river is the 7.5-kilometre (4.7 mi) Beaufort River East that joins the main river just east of where it crosses Albany Highway.

The river's catchment falls within the Blackwood catchment's Beaufort zone as part of the Beaufort system. The system is composed of broad valley floors with a grey sandy duplex and was previously a wandoo sheoak woodland but has now mostly been cleared for agriculture.
