= Glencoe Station =

Pastoral lease and sheep/cattle station in Queensland, Australia

Coordinates: 28°13′01″S 145°42′44″E

Location in Queensland

Glencoe Station is an Australian pastoral lease that operates as a sheep station and more recently as a cattle station. It is located about 17 kilometres (11 mi) south of Cunnamulla and 154 kilometres (96 mi) north east of Hungerford in Queensland. The property is located on the floodplain of the Warrego River.

The station was sold in 1909 by Mr Barney Smith to Mr Moore of New South Wales together with all stock and plant.

The station was "burnt to the ground" in 1934 causing between £1000 and £2000 damage. The owner, Ross MacDonald, and his wife were away at the time and no one was hurt in the fire.

The station was running sheep and owned by a Mr. Beels in 1948.

The property is prone to flooding whenever the Warrego catchment is inundated. The most recent flooding events have been in 1990, 1997 and 2008. In 2008 the property was owned by Hugh Miller who had trouble moving stock in the 2008 flood following early rains that softened the ground.

== See also ==
- List of ranches and stations
