= Moojebing, Western Australia =

Moojebing
- Town
- Interactive map of Moojebing
- Coordinates: 33.605°S 117.507°E
- Country: Australia
- State: Western Australia
- LGA: Shire of Katanning
- Location: 240 km (150 mi) SE of Perth; 10 km (6.2 mi) NNW of Katanning

Government
  - State electorate: Roe
  - Federal division: O'Connor

Area
  - Total: 102.8 km^{2} (39.7 sq mi)
- Elevation: 309 m (1,014 ft)

Population
  - Total: 63 (SAL 2021)
- Postcode: 6317

Moojebing is an abandoned townsite and locality on the Boyerine Creek in the Great Southern region of Western Australia, southeast of Woodanilling and north north west of Katanning. It is located within the Shire of Katanning.

The name Moojebing is an Aboriginal word, believed to be derived from the nearby Moojebup Spring, first recorded under that name in 1874. The meaning of the name is not known, but may be connected with "moodjar" or "muja", the Noongar word for the WA Christmas tree, Nuytsia floribunda. One source claims that Moojebing means "place of moojung birds", but that source is dubious, as there are no references to a "moojung" bird.

== History ==
Moojebing was one of a number of townsites established in the early 1890s, when the WA government opened up a lot of land in the Katanning area. The townsite was gazetted in 1892. It straddled the Great Southern railway, which had opened in 1889, and was also close to other townsites at Katanning, Woodanilling and Pinwernying.

Demand for land in the townsite area was low, and in 1917 much of it was opened up for agricultural purposes.

Parts of the former townsite are now covered by the Moojebing Nature Reserve. The nature reserve was gazetted on 17 August 1973, has a size of 0.44 square kilometres (0.17 mi^{2}), and is located within the Avon Wheatbelt bioregion.

== See also ==
- CBH class – a class of locomotive, one of which is named after the locality
