= Cartmeticup, Western Australia =

Cartmeticup
- Interactive map of Cartmeticup
- Coordinates: 33°27′2″S 117°29′23″E
- Country: Australia
- State: Western Australia
- LGA: Shire of Woodanilling

Government
  - State electorate: Roe
  - Federal division: O'Connor

Area
  - Total: 215.6 km^{2} (83.2 sq mi)

Population
  - Total: 57 (SAL 2021)
- Postcode: 6316

Cartmeticup is a rural locality in the Shire of Woodanilling, Great Southern region of Western Australia. It has a population of 55 as of 2016, with a total of 16 families. The locality name is given to the catchment area of the Woodanilling local government area.
