= List of State Register of Heritage Places in the Shire of Katanning =

List of heritage sites in Western Australia

The State Register of Heritage Places is maintained by the Heritage Council of Western Australia. As of 2026, 122 places are heritage-listed in the Shire of Katanning, of which 19 are on the State Register of Heritage Places.

== List ==
=== State Register of Heritage Places ===
The Western Australian State Register of Heritage Places, as of 2026, lists the following 19 state registered places within the Shire of Katanning:

Place name	Place #	Street number	Street name	Suburb or town	Co-ordinates	Notes & former names	Photo
Katanning Roller Flour Mill	1344	122	Clive Street	Katanning	33.691212°S 117.555119°E	Swan Flour Mill, Premier Flour Mill	
St Andrew's Church and Hall	1329	Corner	Aberdeen & Arbour Streets	Katanning	33.689585°S 117.55217°E	St Andrew's Anglican Church	
Reidy House	1332	23-27	Amherst Street	Katanning	33.690505°S 117.55075°E	Kartanup, St Rita's Convent and School (former)	
Piesse's Winery (former), Katanning	1334	L 201	Warren Road	Katanning	33.68048°S 117.556662°E	Katanning Wine Cellars	
King George Hostel	1339		Albion Street	Katanning	33.691995°S 117.556018°E	Temperance Hotel, St George's Hotel	
Katanning Post Office	1345	101	Clive Street	Katanning	33.689775°S 117.556146°E		
Commonwealth Bank, Katanning	1350	110	Clive Street	Katanning	33.690384°S 117.556634°E	Beeck's Saddlery (former)	
ANZ Bank, Katanning	1352	93	Clive Street	Katanning	33.689465°S 117.55628°E	Union Bank, Australian & New Zealand Bank	
Kobeelya, Katanning	1355	Lot 131	Kobeelya Avenue	Katanning	33.682144°S 117.567856°E	St Michael & All Angels Chapel, Kobeelya Orch, Kobeelya Church of England Girls' School	
Uniting Church, Katanning	1358	Lot 3 & 82	Taylor Street	Katanning	33.68804°S 117.553154°E	Scots' Church, Presbyterian Church	
St Peter's Church	1362		Katanning-Nyabing Road	Badgebup	33.633189°S 117.895829°E	St Peter's Anglican Church	
Katanning Club	3274	12	Amherst Street	Katanning	33.691201°S 117.552779°E	Katanning Men's Club	
Mechanics' Institute, Katanning	3317	22-24	Austral Terrace	Katanning	33.690604°S 117.554103°E	Agricultural Hall	
Katanning Town Hall Buildings	3960	22-24	Austral Terrace	Katanning	33.690488°S 117.554264°E	Remembers Honour Roll, Katanning Roll of Honour & Katanning	
Yowangup Homestead Group	4604	285	Trimmer Road	Moojebing	33.64643°S 117.508581°E	Quartermaine's house (former), Yowangup Homestead, Katanning	
Wake's Garage Group	7083	25-27	Richardson Street	Katanning	33.688786°S 117.554167°E	H. Barrett Stables, Wake's Garage (former), Barrett's Residence, Wake's Residence	
Katanning State School Honour Roll	12893		Austral Terrace	Katanning			
St Andrew's Church Hall	24678		Aberdeen Street	Katanning	33.68957°S 117.552224°E		
St Andrew's Church	24693		Arbour Street	Katanning	33.689376°S 117.551995°E		

=== Shire of Katanning heritage-listed places ===
The following places are heritage listed in the Shire of Katanning but are not State registered:

Place name	Place #	Street number	Street name	Suburb or town	Notes & former names	Photo
Katanning Masonic Hall & Masonic Lodge Roll of Honour	1331	17	Albion Street	Katanning		
Cook's House (former)	1333	19	Broome Street	Katanning	Arts and Craft Centre	
Offices	1335	64	Austral Terrace	Katanning		
F.H. Piesse Memorial	1336		Austral Terrace	Katanning		
Railway Hotel (former)	1337	66-68	Austral Terrace	Katanning	Royal Exchange Hotel	
Streetscape	1338		Austral Terrace	Katanning		
F & C Piesse Store (former)	1341	38	Austral Terrace	Katanning	now Plaza Arcade, Richardson & Co, David Jones	
Katanning Hotel	1342	42-52	Austral Terrace	Katanning	Katanning Unit Hotel	
St Stephen's Lutheran Church (former)	1343	Corner	Avon & 21 Hassell Streets	Katanning	Church Hall	
Great Southern Railway Memorial	1346		Forrest Mill Road	Katanning		
Baptist Church	1347	6	Carew Street	Katanning	Hung Wins Chinese Restaurant	
Bank Buildings	1348	70-72	Clive Street	Katanning	PM's Restaurant	
Federal Hotel	1351	111	Clive Street	Katanning	Fairclough Federal Hotel	
Katanning Police Station & Court House (former)	1353	142	Clive Street	Katanning		
West Australian Bank (former)	1354	Corner	Clive & Taylor Streets	Katanning		
Salvation Army Citadel	1356		Richardson Street	Katanning		
Methodist Church and Hall (former)	1357	23	Taylor Street	Katanning	Autumn Club, Wesleyan Church, Senior Citizens Centre	
Government School (former)	1359	Corner	Taylor & Amabel Streets	Katanning	Museum	
Dyliabing Soak War Memorial	1360		Warren Road	Dyliabing		
Carrolup Agricultural Hall	1361			Carrolup via Katanning	Carrolup School	
Marracoonda Baptist Church	1363	Corner	Great Southern Highway & Onslow Road	Marracoonda	Also listed in the Shire of Woodanilling as Marracoonda Church (17138)	
Rockwell Agricultural Hall	1364		500m North-West of Gidgelbarrup Tank	Rockwell via Katanning	Rockwell School	
Palinup Homestead	3418			Katanning		
Katanning Power House (former)	3419	24 & 26	Albion Street	Katanning		
Coleraine (former), Katanning	3420	32	Beaufort Street	Katanning	Maranartha, Grammar School for Boys, Cornerstone Assembly, Coleraine Private Hospi	
Coblinine River Road Bridge	4650		Warren Road	Katanning	MRWA 4756	
Katanning Meatworks	5128		Great Southern Highway	Katanning	Southern Meat Packers, Metro Meats	
Katanning Primary School	5523	15	Dore Street	Katanning	Dore Street School	
Great Southern Herald	7056	49	Clive Street	Katanning		
House	7057	8	Clive Street	Katanning		
St Ives	7058	32	Park Street	Katanning		
Lutheran Manse (former)	7059	43	Aberdeen Street	Katanning	House	
York House	7060	23	Claude Street	Katanning		
Filmer's Corner (former)	7061	84	Clive Street	Katanning	Cut 'n' Cote	
Stratford	7062	68	Avon Street	Katanning		
Woodchester	7063	19	Clive Street	Katanning		
Kulal	7064	4	Clive Street	Katanning		
Original National Bank - Site	7065	30	Austral Terrace	Katanning	National Bank	
Delrama	7066	39	Adam Street	Katanning		
Rogers' Central Store	7067	100-108	Clive Street	Katanning		
House	7068	50	Arbour Street	Katanning		
House	7069	25	Daping Street	Katanning		
House	7070	10	Britannia Street	Katanning		
Balston Estate	7071	71	Adam Street	Katanning		
Bethshan Lodge including original Mitchell Cottage	7072	5-10	Piesse Street	Katanning	The Pines	
St Patrick's Roman Catholic Church	7073		Amherst Street	Katanning		
Katanning Swimming Pool	7075		Piesse Street	Katanning		
Illareen	7076	425	Fairfield Road	Katanning		
Indinup	7077		Kojonup Road	Katanning	Springfield	
Wilgermar Estate	7078		Kojonup Road	Katanning	Springfield site (former), Indinup	
Recreation Grounds	7079		Pemble Street	Katanning	Showgrounds, Rubbish Tip	
New Lodge Motel	7080	172	Clive Street	Katanning	Kimberley Lodge, White House	
Katanning Hospital (former)	7081	44-46	Amherst Street	Katanning	Amherst Units	
Katanning Railway Station (former)	7082		Austral Terrace	Katanning	Kanwork Option Centre	
Stock & Trading Co Ltd (former)	7084	68	Austral Terrace	Katanning	Taylor, Notts & Molinari	
Ogden Residence	7085	74	Blantyre Road	Katanning	McLeod Residence	
Katanning Brickworks	7086		Strickland Street	Katanning		
Katanning Senior High School	7087		Golflinks Road	Katanning		
Silver Band Hall	7088	Corner	Richardson & Amabel Streets	Katanning		
Rotary Wishing Well	7089	Corner	Austral Terrace & Clive Street	Katanning		
Town Clock	7090	Corner	Austral Terrace & Clive Street	Katanning		
First School Site Memorial	7091		Austral Terrace	Katanning		
Eticup Station (former)	7092		Police Pools Road	Katanning	Police Pools	
Katanning War Memorial	8700	Corner	Carew & Cliff Streets	Katanning		
Katanning RSL Memorial Garden	12892		Clive Street	Katanning		
Katanning UAOD Honor Roll, Marracoonda School Honour Roll &	12894		Albion Street	Katanning	Moojebing State School roll of Honour	
Residence	13164	19	Piesse Street	Katanning		
J Squires, Wheelwright & Undertakers (former)	13169	21	Richardson Street	Katanning	B D Coventry & Sons, Funeral Directors	
Residence	13170	76	Bokarup Street	Katanning		
Residence	13172	43	Bokarup Street	Katanning		
Clive Street Precinct	13173	116-120	Clive Street	Katanning	Mills Dentist, Frank Freemantles Chemist, News, Bankwest, Toyworld, Retravision, Wells & Co	
Uffcott (former)	13174	5	Hassell Street	Katanning	Residence	
Badgebup Honour Roll, Rockwell Honour Roll & Darcy R Turner Memorial	14031		Badgebup Dist Hall, Katanning-Nyabing Road	Badgebup	Badgebup School	
Child Health Centre	14395	8	Austral Terrace	Katanning	Infant Health Centre	
Katanning Fire Station site & Katanning Fire Station (new)	14529	6	Austral Terrace	Katanning		
Mosque	14530	2	Warren Road	Katanning		
Alicetine and Site of Coompatine, Katanning	14719	1137	Katanning-Dumbleyung Road	Moojebing		
Radio Station	14768	103	Warburton Road	Katanning	6WB	
Heart of the Great Southern Garden	14780	Corner	Clive Street & Moojebing Road	Katanning		
Bank of New South Wales (NSW) (former)	14784	127	Clive Street	Katanning	Westpac	
Quartermaine Fountain, All Ages Playground	14867		Clive Street	Katanning		
Uniting Church Manse	15094	Corner	Annie & Beaufront Streets	Katanning		
Holland's Track	16818			Track extends over Multiple LGAs		
Katanning Police Station	17440	148	Clive Street	Katanning		
Aboriginal Evangelical Church, Katanning	17670	22	Richardson Street	Katanning	Rechabite Hall, CWA Hall	
St Christopher's House	17671	1	Golflinks Road	Katanning		
TAFE House	17672	18	Dapling Street	Katanning		
Katanning Hospital Gates	17673	33	Adam Street	Katanning		
Dongolocking School Building	17674		Richardson Street	Katanning		
Katanning Croquet Club	17675	28	Piesse Street	Katanning		
Old School Sites - Katanning	17676			Various	Moojebing, Mean Mahn & Ewlyamartup Sites, Murdong & Woodlyn, Corackin & Glencoe Sites	
St Patrick's Primary School	17677		Cnr Annie & Amherst Streets	Katanning	Sacred Heart Convent, St Rita's Convent	
Courthouse	17681	149	Clive Street	Katanning		
Police Quarters	17683	146	Clive Street	Katanning		
House, 7 Cobham Street, Katanning	24579	7	Cobham Street	Katanning		
Austin Lea (Katanning Research Station)	25136		Katanning - Nyabing Road	Kojonup		
Katanning Research Station	25138		Katanning - Nyabing Road	Kojonup	Animal Breeding & Research Institute	
St Claire (Katanning Research Station)	25146		Katanning-Nyabing Road	Kojonup		
Teds (Katanning Research Station)	25147		Katanning-Nyabing Road	Kojonup		
Katanning District Hospital	25601	11	Kobeelya Avenue	Katanning	Katanning Health Service	
Bridge 0351, Great Southern Highway	26009		Great Southern Highway	Katanning	MRWA Bridge No. 0351	
Bridge 0352, Great Southern Highway	26010		Great Southern Highway	Katanning	MRWA Bridge No. 0352	
Bridge 0647, Kojonup-Pingrup Road, Katanning	27049		Kojonup-Pingrup Road	Katanning		
