= Glencoe, Oklahoma =

Town in the United States

- Town
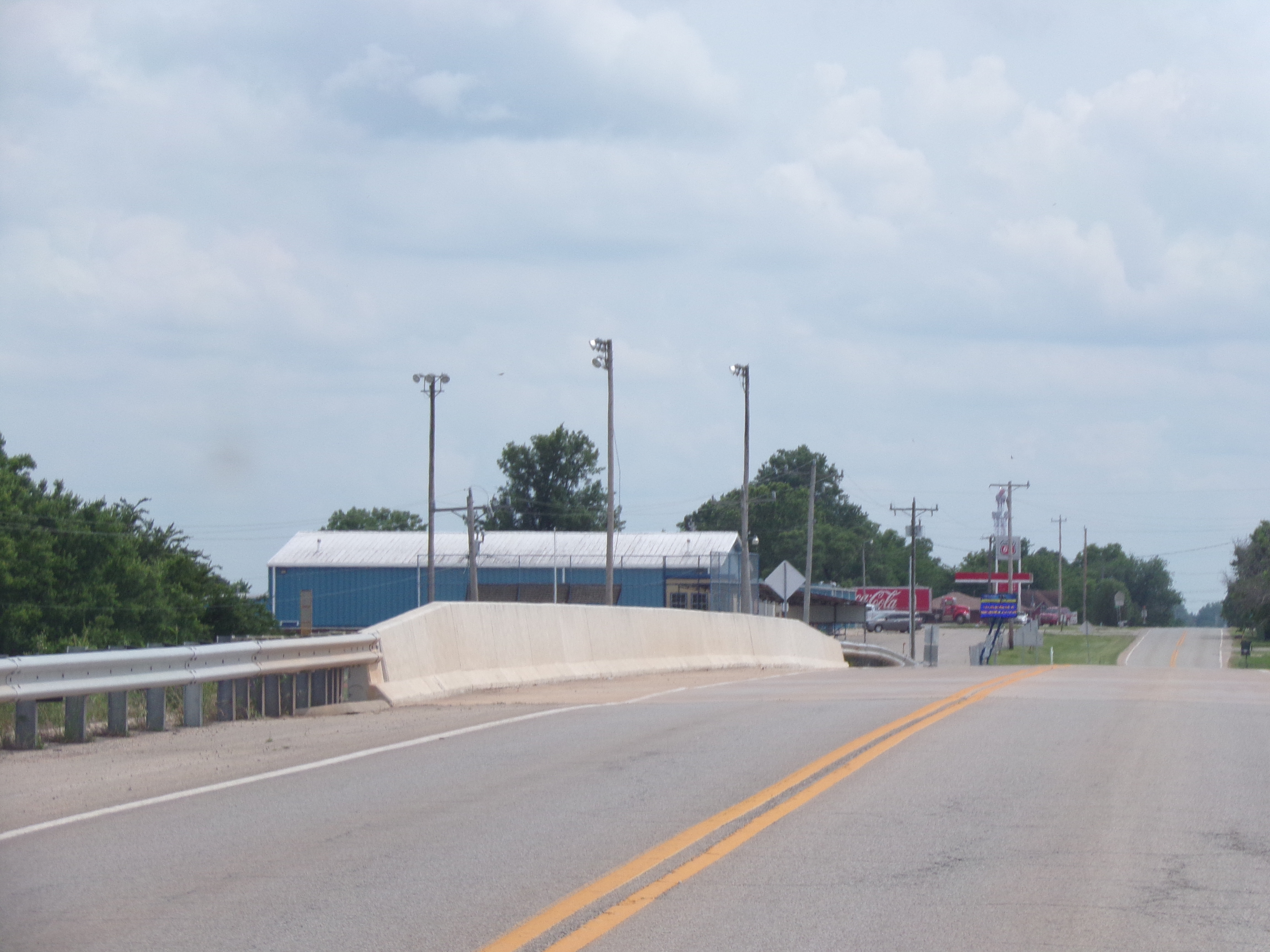
- Glencoe, as seen coming from Lela
- Nickname: Gem of Payne County
- Motto: "How do you build history?"
- Location within Payne County and Oklahoma
- Coordinates: 36°13′54″N 96°55′53″W
- Country: United States
- State: Oklahoma
- County: Payne

Government
  - Type: Mayor-City Council
  - Mayor: Shawna Bales

Area
  - Total: 1.71 sq mi (4.43 km^{2})
  - Land: 1.68 sq mi (4.34 km^{2})
  - Water: 0.039 sq mi (0.10 km^{2})
- Elevation: 1,043 ft (318 m)

Population (2020)
  - Total: 499
  - Density: 298.1/sq mi (115.09/km^{2})
- Time zone: UTC-6 (Central (CST))
  - Summer (DST): UTC-5 (CDT)
- ZIP code: 74032
- Area code: 580
- FIPS code: 40-29400
- GNIS feature ID: 2412684

Glencoe is a town in northern Payne County, Oklahoma, United States. As of the 2020 census, Glencoe had a population of 499. Glencoe is a midway point between Pawnee County and Stillwater, which is the county seat.

== History ==
Glencoe was founded in 1899 with the establishment of the Glenco Post Office on the Eastern Oklahoma Railway. The first lots were sold on April 15, 1900. After J. Hunter Williams, editor of the Glencoe Mirror, was named postmaster on January 4, 1901, he persuaded the U.S. Post Office Department to change the spelling of the town's name to Glencoe. (Note: Glen Coe is a glen in Scotland where soldiers commanded by a Captain Campbell once massacred members of the Clan MacDonald.) Also that year, Glencoe was reported to be a sundown town, prohibiting African Americans from living or stopping in the town. In its early history Glencoe served as a trading center for the area and agriculture was the mainstay of the local economy. On January 22, 1914, a fire swept through downtown and destroyed most of the business district. While some businesses were rebuilt, the town's future growth was negatively affected by the fire.

== Geography ==
According to the United States Census Bureau, the town has a total area of 0.8 square miles (2.1 km^{2}), all land. The town is 7 miles (11 km) east of Stillwater, the county seat, on State Highway 51 and 8 miles (13 km) north on State Highway 108.

Glencoe is a hub for northern Payne County and southern Noble County and serves as the principal community for the area. With deep historical ties to agriculture, the culture of the town is based around the traditions that accompany farming.

Glencoe is located approximately 5.8 miles from Lake Lone Chimney, on the border between Payne and Pawnee counties. The lake historically served as a recreational outlet for the town, drawing in sportsmen for tournaments and other outdoors event. Following the drought which ravished the region in the early 2010s, the lake experienced dramatic water losses and as a result, the economy and culture of the town was negatively impacted.

== Demographics ==
Historical population
Census	Pop.	Note	%±
1910	373		—
1920	354		−5.1%
1930	297		−16.1%
1940	337		13.5%
1950	309		−8.3%
1960	284		−8.1%
1970	421		48.2%
1980	490		16.4%
1990	473		−3.5%
2000	583		23.3%
2010	601		3.1%
2020	499		−17.0%
U.S. Decennial Census

=== 2020 census ===
As of the 2020 census, Glencoe had a population of 499. The median age was 39.9 years. 26.5% of residents were under the age of 18 and 17.4% of residents were 65 years of age or older. For every 100 females there were 95.7 males, and for every 100 females age 18 and over there were 88.2 males age 18 and over.

0.0% of residents lived in urban areas, while 100.0% lived in rural areas.

There were 206 households in Glencoe, of which 31.6% had children under the age of 18 living in them. Of all households, 45.1% were married-couple households, 16.5% were households with a male householder and no spouse or partner present, and 33.0% were households with a female householder and no spouse or partner present. About 26.7% of all households were made up of individuals and 14.1% had someone living alone who was 65 years of age or older.

There were 249 housing units, of which 17.3% were vacant. The homeowner vacancy rate was 2.1% and the rental vacancy rate was 11.7%.

Racial composition as of the 2020 census
Race	Number	Percent
White	398	79.8%
Black or African American	0	0.0%
American Indian and Alaska Native	38	7.6%
Asian	2	0.4%
Native Hawaiian and Other Pacific Islander	2	0.4%
Some other race	0	0.0%
Two or more races	59	11.8%
Hispanic or Latino (of any race)	5	1.0%

=== 2000 census ===
As of the census of 2000, there were 583 people, 233 households, and 164 families residing in the town. The population density was 740.9 inhabitants per square mile (286.1/km^{2}). There were 261 housing units at an average density of 331.7 per square mile (128.1/km^{2}). The racial makeup of the town was 90.74% White, 0.17% African American, 4.46% Native American, 0.51% from other races, and 4.12% from two or more races. Hispanic or Latino of any race were 0.69% of the population.

There were 233 households, out of which 34.8% had children under the age of 18 living with them, 57.5% were married couples living together, 11.6% had a female householder with no husband present, and 29.2% were non-families. 27.0% of all households were made up of individuals, and 12.4% had someone living alone who was 65 years of age or older. The average household size was 2.50 and the average family size was 3.02.

In the town, the population was spread out, with 27.6% under the age of 18, 8.7% from 18 to 24, 27.1% from 25 to 44, 23.2% from 45 to 64, and 13.4% who were 65 years of age or older. The median age was 37 years. For every 100 females, there were 84.5 males. For every 100 females age 18 and over, there were 80.3 males.

The median income for a household in the town was $30,658, and the median income for a family was $35,769. Males had a median income of $24,219 versus $20,938 for females. The per capita income for the town was $12,643. About 6.4% of families and 8.1% of the population were below the poverty line, including 6.8% of those under age 18 and 15.5% of those age 65 or over.

== Culture ==
The culture of the town is widely influenced by traditions of the Southern United States. Festivals and carnivals are an annual event in which people from all over the region come to take part in the events.

Glencoe, located within the Bible Belt, is predominantly Evangelical Protestant with a majority of the townspeople either following teachings that correlate to the United Methodist, Southern Baptist, or Nondenominational churches. Despite the differences, all congregations within the town part-take in the Ministerial Alliance, to which churches come together often to focus on the theological similarities.

Glencoe was the setting for an independent film Left of Center, based on the book by Brandi Hodges.

== Education ==
Glencoe is located approximately 16.7 miles from Oklahoma State University to which many residents hold as an alma mater or employer.

Glencoe is home to a Class A school system. Glencoe High School has been given an 'A' value on the annual state report cards which are assigned by the Oklahoma Department of Education.

== Sports ==
Glencoe has strong ties to basketball, baseball and softball. Glencoe is known statewide for its local basketball program, which won the state champion title in years pasts, as well as three consecutive times in the years 2013, 2014, and 2015. Glencoe was also state champions in basketball in 2006 and in 2022.

== See also ==
- List of sundown towns in the United States
