= Marribank =

Locality in Great Southern region of Western Australia

- Interactive map of the Marribank area
- Former names: Carrolup Native Settlement Marribank Children's Home Marribank Farm School Marribank Mission

General information
- Location: Cherry Tree Pool, Shire of Kojonup, Western Australia, Mission Road, Australia
- Coordinates: 33.655°S 117.248°E

Design and construction
- Designations: Register of the National Estate & State Register of Heritage Places

Register of the National Estate
- Designated: 14 May 1991

Western Australia Heritage Register
- Type: State Registered Place
- Designated: 22 May 2007
- Reference no.: 10592

Marribank, earlier known as Carrolup Native Settlement, is located in the Shire of Kojonup, Western Australia, approximately 30 kilometres (19 mi) north-west of Katanning. It was the site of one of two large native settlements for Indigenous Australians established by the office of the Protector of Aborigines of the Western Australian state government. The settlement was one place that the Stolen Generations were taken after being separated from their families. Artworks produced by children at Carrolup are some of the only extant objects produced by members of the Stolen Generations across Australia.

== History ==
=== Background ===
In 1905, the Western Australian government approved an act that deemed all Aboriginal or part-Aboriginal children to be wards of the state, with the Chief Protector of Aborigines (now considered their legal guardian) granted the legal power to take them from their parents' care and put them into institutions. Aboriginal children were taken from their parents, especially if they had a European or part-European ancestry, in order to break the possibility of being socialised within traditional Aboriginal language and culture, as a part of a government policy which has become known as the Stolen Generations. It was hoped by the Protector of Aborigines that boys would be trained as agricultural labourers, and girls would obtain work as domestic servants.

Children living at Carrolup of marriageable age had to obtain official government permission to marry. As the official policy was acknowledged as "smoothing the pillow of a dying race", the "breeding out" of Aboriginal racial characteristics was encouraged. The officials took little or no action in cases of sexual abuse of girls by those officially in charge of them.

=== Carrolup Native Settlement (1915-1922) ===
Carrolup was established in 1915 as a government-run "native settlement", with a Superintendent from the Australian Aborigines Mission, which also provided volunteer staff. It lay not far from the Western Australian town of Katanning, after complaints by white farmers and settlers about the Aboriginal fringe dwellers living north of the town, who were attending school to the south. Together with settlements at Moore River, Roelands and Gnowangerup, at one stage it formed part of a number of institutions that housed most of the Noongar people of the south west of Western Australia.

The Carrolup facility was closed in 1922, with all residents transferred to the Moore River Settlement.

=== Carrolup Native Settlement (1939-1951) ===
The settlement was re-opened by the Department of Native Affairs in 1939, and by 1944 it housed 129 boys, girls and older children. In the late 1940s artworks made by some of the children gained international attention.

In 1949 the school at Carrolup was closed down, and the school-age children were transferred to other sites. In 1951 the native settlement was closed and the adults living there were "dispersed"; teenage boys were kept back to establish Marribank Farm Training School.

=== Marribank Farm Training School (1951-1952) ===
The short-lived farm training school for Aboriginal boys was handed over to the Baptist Church in 1952.

=== Marribank (1952-1988) ===
The settlement was run by the Baptist Union of Western Australia as an Aboriginal mission between 1952 and 1988.

== Carrolup child artists ==
=== Early fame ===
In the late 1940s and early 1950s, as Carrolup Native Settlement, the site became the setting of a Noongar (South-West Aboriginal) Art movement among the children resident there, famous for its portrayals of local Western Australian scenes at sunset.

The Carrolup artists included Revel Cooper, Reynold Hart, Mervyn Hill, Parnell Dempster, Claude Kelly, Micky Jackson and Barry Loo.

An exhibition of Carrolup artists was organised in Perth and in a number of Australian towns and cities. With the assistance of Florence Rutter, exhibitions also took place in London, Manchester, Edinburgh and Glasgow. The closure of Carrolup Native Settlement in 1951 put an end to the international exhibitions.

=== Dispersal of artworks ===
The "lost" collection of Carrolup children's art was made by Florence Rutter, principally to exhibit and sell on behalf of the children, in the United Kingdom and the Netherlands, through the Aboriginal Children's Trust that she set up in London. The collection includes a personal selection that Florence made for both herself and her family. However, she lost all her own money, together with that held by the Trust, to a con man. Destitute, she advertised its availability and was able to sell it to Herbert Mayer of New York city.

Rutter died in 1958, her dreams shattered. Some say she died of a broken heart. Herbert Mayer gifted the collection to his old university, Colgate, in upstate New York in 1966. This is the collection that Howard Morphy "found" at the Picker Gallery at Colgate University in 2004. A year later, Athol Farmer, Ezzard Flowers and John Stanton travelled to the United States to inspect the collection and to select items for inclusion in the 2006 "Koorah Coolingah" exhibition at Katanning, with a parallel exhibition at the Western Australian Museum in Perth, which were part of the Perth International Arts Festival. The Curtin University, John Curtin Gallery is custodian of 125 works bought back to Noongar country from the Colgate University and are in development of a Centre for Truth Telling, a home for the Carrolup child artist works to enable them to be shared with the community and help inform of the past injustices imposed under Colonial settlement.

=== Renewed attention (1980s onwards) ===
A number of prominent Western Australian Aboriginal Artists started their work at Marribank, and were the subject of two national travelling benchmark exhibitions curated by the Director of the Berndt Museum of Anthropology at The University of Western Australia, "Nyungar Landscapes" containing elements of the extensive Melvie, Stan and Gael Phillips Collection donated to the Berndt Museum and (with Noongar artist Sandra Hill) "Aboriginal Artists of the South-West", containing items from the Noel and Lily White Collection presented to the Museum by Noelene and Ross White.

As part of a community initiated project began in 1987, two Noongar trainees participated in a teaching program in museology at the Anthropology Research Museum, as the Berndt Museum of Anthropology was then known. Tina Hansen and Cora Farmer were funded by the Aboriginal Arts Board of the Australia Council to work towards establishing a Cultural Centre at Marribank/Carrolup. Members of the community had sought assistance from John Stanton after they heard of his interest in the Carrolup children's drawings produced in the 1946-50 period. The Museum had been actively acquiring examples of these drawings for several years. Copies of these and related materials, including photographs, manuscripts and press clippings, were lodged with the Cultural Centre, which was funded by the Australian Bicentennial Authority, and opened in 1988. Hansen and Farmer learnt, while they were on placement with the Museum, collections management skills, display techniques, and photographic and videographic processes. They both spent the following year refining documentation on historical photographs. The first exhibition, in one room of the Old Boys' Dormitory, traced the history of Carrolup Native Settlement, as it was known, and the emergence of the "bush landscape" school of art there. Another room displayed contemporary Noongar works. A further gallery, which focussed on the Marribank years, opened in 1992.

== Today's site ==
After the settlement was abandoned, many of the buildings fell into disrepair. In 2016 a project was launched to transform the site into a cultural healing centre for Stolen Generations survivors and their communities.
