= Woodanilling, Western Australia =

Woodanilling
- Town
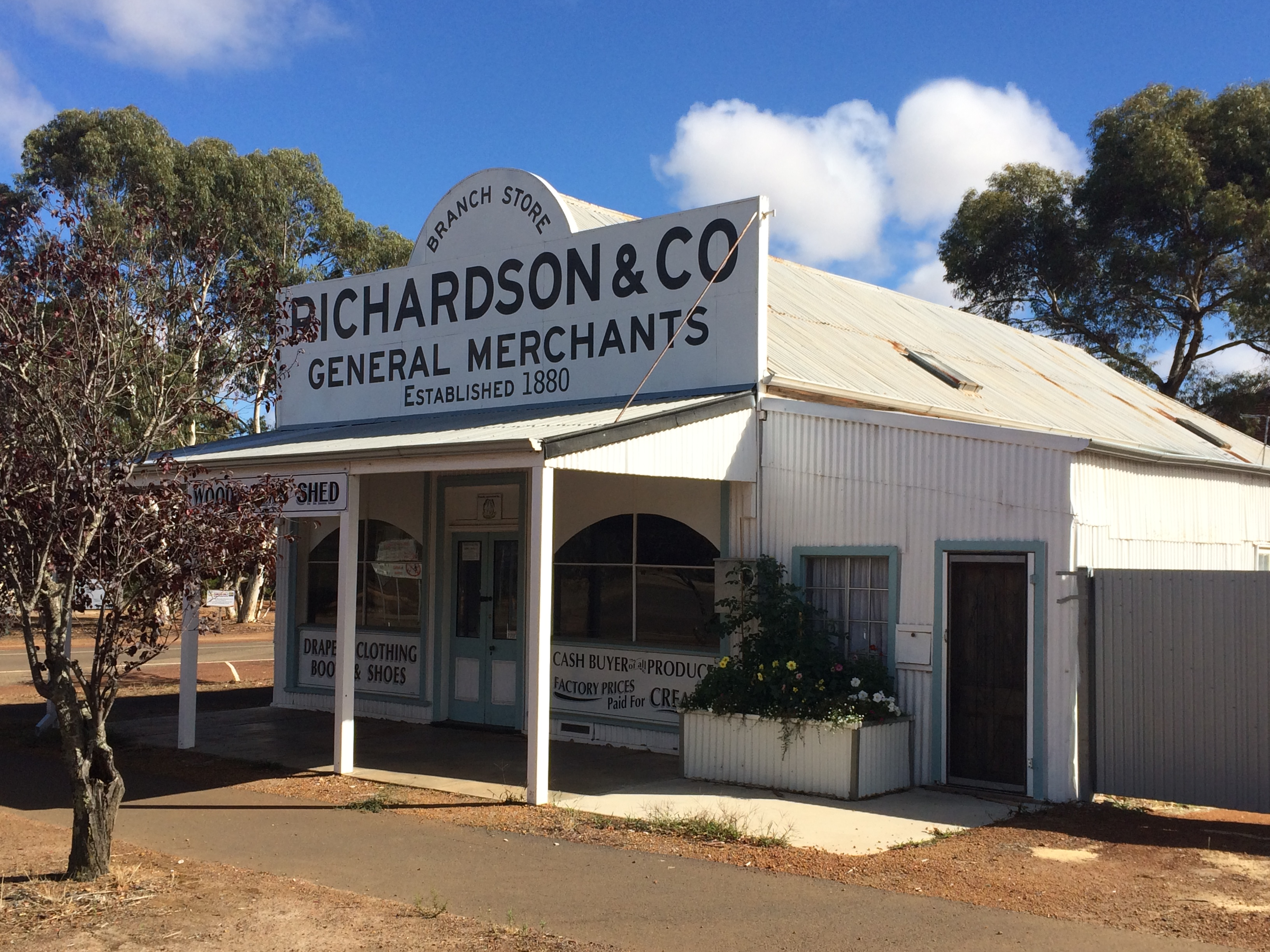
- Building in Woodanilling

- Interactive map of Woodanilling
- Coordinates: 33°34′00″S 117°26′00″E
- Country: Australia
- State: Western Australia
- LGA: Shire of Woodanilling
- Location: 254 km (158 mi) south east of Perth; 24 km (15 mi) north west of Katanning; 30 km (19 mi) south of Wagin
- Established: 1892

Government
  - State electorate: Roe
  - Federal division: O'Connor

Area
  - Total: 89.5 km^{2} (34.6 sq mi)
- Elevation: 311 m (1,020 ft)

Population
  - Total: 207 (SAL 2021)
- Postcode: 6316

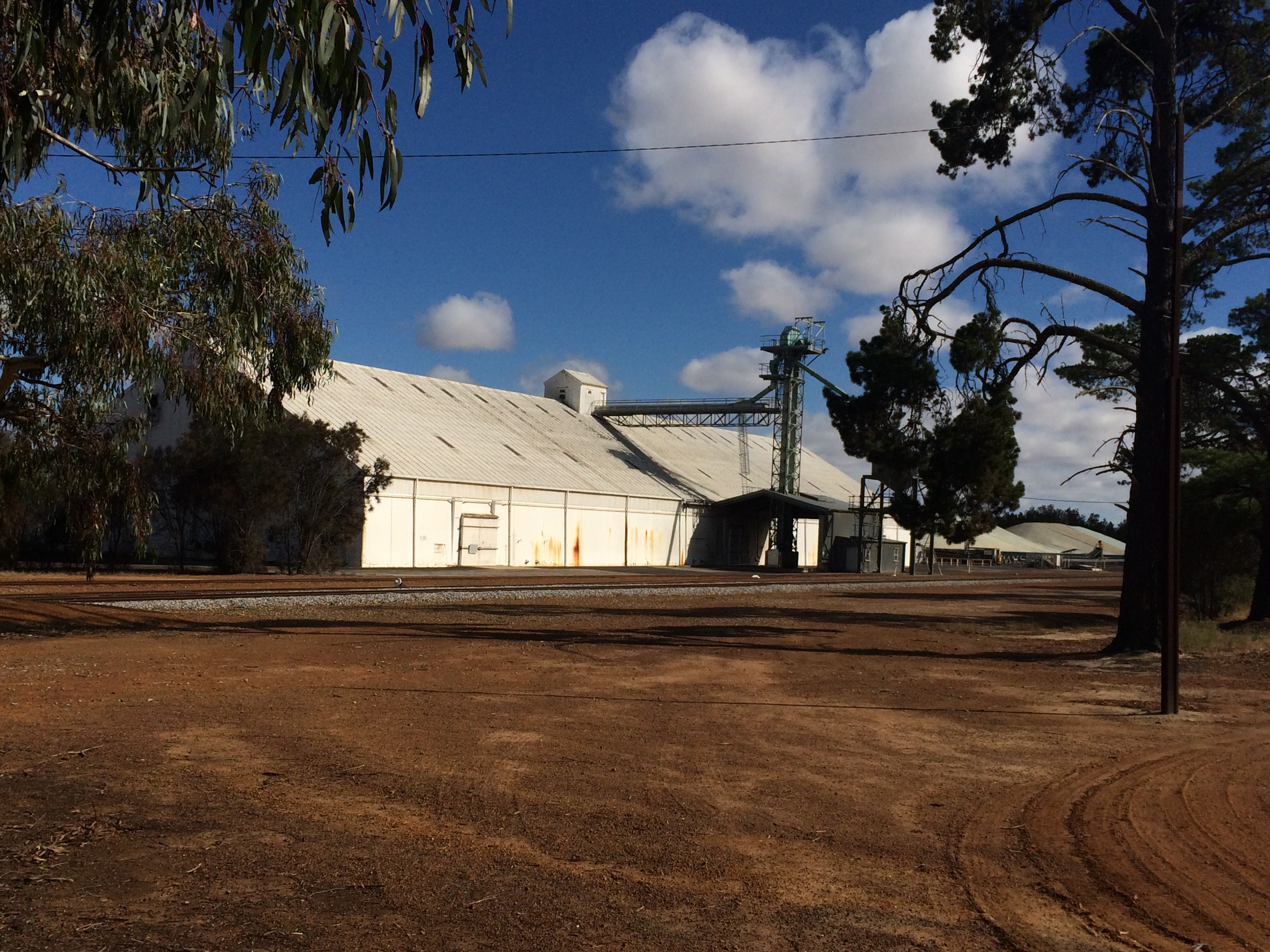
Grain storage Woodanilling 2018

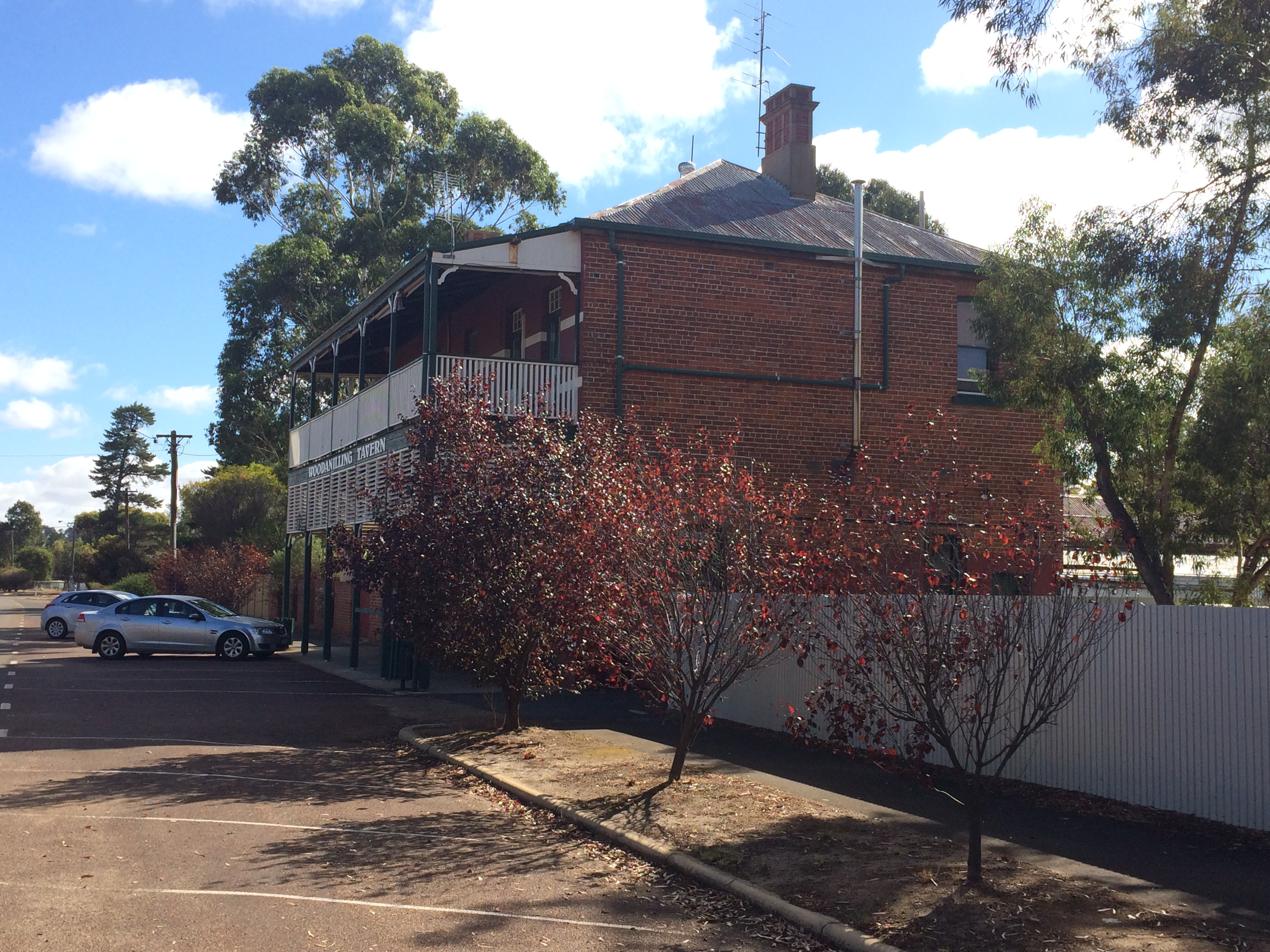
Woodanilling Hotel 2018

Woodanilling is a small town and locality in the Shire of Woodanilling, Great Southern region of Western Australia.

== Location ==
The town is 254 kilometres (158 mi) south of Perth on the Great Southern Highway, 24 kilometres (15 mi) from Katanning and 30 kilometres (19 mi) from Wagin.

The town is in a sheep and grain producing area and was named after a spring in the Boyerine Creek, found about 1 kilometre (0.6 mi) south of town.

== History ==
The Wiilman people of the Noongar nation are the traditional owners of the Woodanilling area. The name Woodanilling means in Noongar language "the place of little fishes".

During 1830–31, the area was first explored by Europeans, in expeditions by Captain Thomas Bannister. The construction of Albany Highway in the early 1850s and the Great Southern Railway in 1889 brought settlers to the area and helped to establish the town, which was located on a railway siding that was initially known as Round Pool. The townsite was gazetted in 1892. In 1895 it was renamed Yarabin and changed finally to Woodanilling the following year (1896). The name Woodanilling is Aboriginal in origin and means either "lots of minnows" or "place where the bronzewing pigeon nests".

An agricultural hall and public school were built in the town prior to 1903 (when the school was closed temporarily after the teacher, a Mr Campbell, was transferred).

By 1906, the Woodanilling Road Board was formed and the population of the shire swelled to 800, during its most prosperous period (1905 to 1920). At around this time the town boasted five general stores, a blacksmith, post office, bakery, hotel, railway station and trotting track.

"Mallet" (marlock or mallee) bark was also exported from the area in large quantities by 1907.

The foundation stone of the local Baptist church was laid in 1908 in front of a large gathering including the local pastor, Rev. W. Kennedy.

The Western Australian Bank branch and new hotel were erected in the town in 1908, along with many improvements being made to the school. Local farmers were confident of a bumper crop after experiencing favourable conditions for the year. The railway station yard was upgraded later the same year, a weighbridge, new crossing, tracking yards and enlarging the current yard were all completed the following year. The school changed teachers four times in 1908, with finding suitable quarters being the main problem. The school was also enlarged to cater for the growing enrolment.

Between 1920 and 1960 migrants from Ireland, Germany, England and even China arrived contributing to the fabric of the local community.

The local school was destroyed by fire in June 1949, the school had 64 students enrolled at the time. By November the minister of education decided that a new primary school would be built but older students would travel to Katanning for their classes.

== Economy ==
The town services the surrounding area which is primarily concerned with sheep and wheat.

== Nature reserve ==
The Woodanilling Nature Reserve, east of the townsite, was gazetted on 8 September 1911, has a size of 1.34 square kilometres (0.52 sq mi), and is located within the Avon Wheatbelt bioregion.
