= -up =

Suffix found in place names in Western Australia

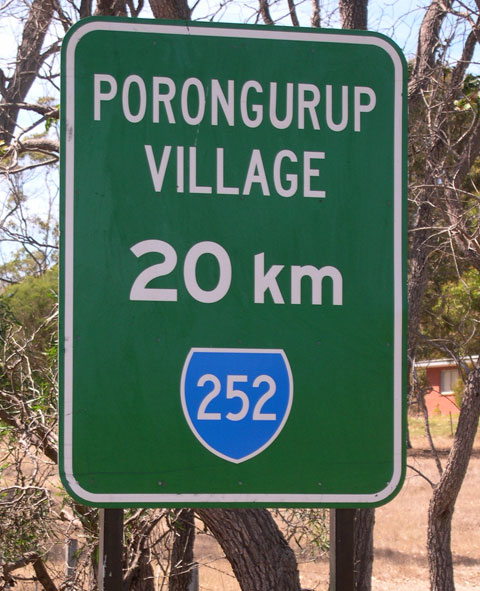
Porongurup is an example of a Western Australian place with a name that includes the "-up" suffix.

-up /ʌp/ is a suffix commonly found in place names in south western Western Australia.

The suffix originated in a dialect of Noongar, an Australian Aboriginal language, in which "-up" means "place of". The suffix "-in" or "-ing" has a similar meaning in a related dialect of Noongar.

Places tended to be named after their distinctive features, whereby the place names could be used to create a "mental map" allowing Indigenous Australians to determine where water, food and other raw materials could be found. These sites were often located near sources of fresh water, leading to the common misconception that "up" and "in" mean "near water". The meanings and the pronunciations of many of these names has been lost over time.

A number of these places were at one stage named with a suffix "-upp". This was as a result of the Western Australian Lands and Surveys Department adopting a system of spelling Indigenous Australian names devised by the Royal Geographical Society.

The system set the pronunciation of consonants as in English and vowels as in Italian. Using this system meant that "up" would be pronounced /uːp/ oop, whereas the names were meant to be pronounced /ʌp/ up. The solution was deemed to be that doubling the following consonant would shorten the preceding vowel, thus "upp". This spelling convention was rescinded for towns in south west Western Australia in 1915 as the Australian pronunciation of "u" was almost always short. The usage of some terms are for the name of Noongar groups as well as places Pinjarup is one of a number of names for one group – and it has been utilised and changed to the place name of Pinjarra.

Earlier attempts had been published in the 1900s and 1920s exploring and explaining place names in the south west of Western Australia.

== List of places ==
The following is a selected list of locations in Western Australia which end in "-up".

| Name | Location | Place name meaning (where known) |
|---|---|---|
| Amelup | 34°14′18″S 118°13′16″E | |
| Badgebup | 33°36′07″S 117°53′02″E | "place of wild rushes" |
| Bailup | 31°44′24″S 116°18′40″E | Aboriginal unknown origin. |
| Balgarup | | "place of the black boy trees" (Xanthorrhoea preissii). |
| Balingup | 33°47′13″S 115°58′55″E | Derived from the name of an Aboriginal warrior, Balingan. |
| Banjup | 32°07′26″S 115°52′34″E | Named for Banjupp Lake. |
| Barragup | 32°32′38″S 115°47′38″E | Not known. |
| Beenup | 32°13′19″S 116°00′04″E | A corruption of the Aboriginal name of nearby Beenyup Brook. Now known as Byford. |
| Binningup | 33°08′56″S 115°41′20″E | Apparently an Aboriginal name, but not necessarily traditional. |
| Boranup | 34°08′42″S 115°03′29″E | |
| Boyanup | 33°29′10″S 115°43′48″E | "a place of quartz" |
| Boyup Brook | 33°50′02″S 116°23′17″E | "place of smoke" |
| Burekup | 33°19′0″S 115°48′0″E | The Aboriginal name of a wildflower that grows profusely in the locality. |
| Carbunup River | 33°42′0″S 115°11′0″E | " Variously "place of a kindly stream", "place of cormorants", and "place of the stinkwood thicket. |
| Cardup | 32°15′25″S 115°59′46″E | "place of the racehorse goanna". |
| Chinocup | 33°32′0″S 118°23′0″E | an Aboriginal word of unknown meaning. |
| Condingup | 33°45′S 122°32′E | an Aboriginal word of unknown meaning. |
| Coodanup | 32°33′14″S 115°44′38″E | Unknown. |
| Cookernup | 32°59′38″S 115°53′35″E | "the place of the swamp hen". |
| Coolbellup | 32°04′55″S 115°49′05″E | The Aboriginal name of a lake in the area. |
| Cooloongup | 32°17′46″S 115°46′48″E | "place of children". |
| Coolup | 32°44′0″S 115°52′0″E | "place of the wild turkey". |
| Coomalbidgup | 33°38′0″S 121°22′0″E | "Possum scratches up a tree & there is water there". |
| Cowaramup | 33°51′05″S 115°06′21″E | believed to be derived from cowara, the Aboriginal name for the purple-crowned lorikeet (Glossopsitta porphyrocephala). |
| Culeenup (Cooleenup) | 33°34′34″S 115°46′23″E | |
| Cundinup | 33.849°S 115.804°E | |
| Dalyellup | 33°24′07″S 115°37′30″E | still, frothy water |
| Dalyup | 33°43′0″S 121°36′0″E | Possibly the Noongar word for the king parrot or Hookbill. |
| Dandalup | 32.519°S 115.968°E | Not known. |
| Dardanup | 33°24′0″S 115°45′0″E | Believed to be a variation of the Aboriginal word "Dudingup" the meaning of which is not known. |
| Dinninup | 33°49′0″S 116°32′0″E | An Aboriginal name of unknown meaning. |
| Dwellingup | 32°42′54″S 116°03′50″E | "place of nearby water". |
| Gelorup | 33°24′36″S 115°38′28″E | |
| Gidgegannup | 31°47′31″S 116°11′53″E | "place where spears are made". "Gidgie" is the word for spear. |
| Gnowangerup | 33°56′17″S 118°00′29″E | "place where the mallee hen nests" (Leipoa ocellata). |
| Gwelup | 31°52′34″S 115°47′56″E | "the lake that shifted position", derived from "Gwelgannow" which means to "shift the position" and "step aside". |
| Gwindinup | 33°31′0″S 115°44′0″E | May be a local spelling of the nearby Gynudup Brook. |
| Jacup | 33°46′48″S 119°09′04″E | |
| Jandabup | 31°44′28″S 115°51′04″E | "place of little eagle". |
| Jerdacuttup | 33°43′0″S 120°28′0″E | Named for the Jerdacuttup River. |
| Jerramungup | 33°56′31″S 118°54′58″E | "place of upstanding yate trees" (Eucalyptus cornuta). |
| Jingalup | 33°58′0″S 117°02′0″E | A contraction of nearby Kodjingalup Well. |
| Joondalup | 31°44′42″S 115°45′58″E | "place of whiteness or glistening". |
| Joweelingup | 32°35′31″S 115°49′55″E | |
| Karnup | 32°22′05″S 115°49′37″E | A local Aboriginal name, the meaning of the name is not known. |
| Karrakup | 32°15′22″S 116°04′12″E | From "Karrak", the Nyoongar word for the red-tailed black cockatoo which is prevalent in the area. |
| Karrinyup | 31°52′12″S 115°46′41″E | Originally Careniup, of unknown meaning. |
| Kebaringup | 34°02′0″S 118°09′0″E | A local Aboriginal name, the meaning of the name is not known. |
| Kendenup | 34°29′10″S 117°37′44″E | Of Aboriginal origin, of unknown meaning. |
| Kirup | 33°42′25″S 115°53′31″E | "the place of summer flies". |
| Kojonup | 33°50′17″S 117°09′07″E | "place of the stone axe". |
| Kudardup | 34°15′47″S 115°07′26″E | Named for Coodardup Mill. |
| Kulikup | 33°50′0″S 116°41′0″E | Not known. |
| Kundip | 33°41′0″S 120°11′0″E | Not known. |
| Kuringup | 33°31′S 118°19′E | "place of wattle gum". |
| Kwobrup | 33°36′S 117°58′E | "good place". |
| Mandogalup | 32°12′18″S 115°48′54″E | An Aboriginal name, the meaning of which is unknown. |
| Manjimup | 34°14′17″S 116°08′31″E | An Aboriginal name said to be derived from "Manjin", a broad leafed marsh flag with an edible root. |
| Marbelup | 34°59′0″S 117°44′0″E | Not known. |
| Marrinup | 32°40′08″S 116°01′23″E | |
| Mariginiup | 31°43′19″S 115°49′37″E | "to pull out flag leaved flax". |
| Mayanup | 33°56′0″S 116°27′0″E | No meaning or source for the name given. |
| Metricup | 33°46′41″S 115°07′59″E | |
| Monjebup | 34°17′35″S 118°32′49″E | |
| Moodiarrup | 33°37′0″S 116°48′0″E | Not known. |
| Morangup | 31°37′3″S 116°19′20″E | |
| Mullalyup | 33°44′42″S 115°56′53″E | "the place where the young men had their noses pierced". |
| Mumballup | 33°31′41″S 116°06′47″E | |
| Mungalup | 33°24′0″S 116°06′0″E | Not known. |
| Munglinup | 33°43′0″S 120°52′0″E | A local Aboriginal word. |
| Muradup | 33°51′0″S 116°59′0″E | An Aboriginal name. |
| Myalup | 33°06′07″S 115°41′38″E | An Aboriginal name derived from a nearby swamp. |
| Nambeelup | 32°31′55″S 115°49′55″E | |
| Nannup | 33°58′55″S 115°45′54″E | "stopping place" or "place of parrots". |
| Narrikup | 34°46′26″S 117°42′07″E | "place of abundance" |
| Needilup | 33°57′0″S 118°46′0″E | Not known. |
| Neerabup | 31°41′28″S 115°46′37″E | Possibly "swampy place" or "small basin or lake". |
| Noggerup | 33°35′0″S 116°10′0″E | Not known. |
| Nornalup | 34°59′28″S 116°49′19″E | "place of black snake" (Norn, a name of a Pseudechis species). |
| Nowergup | 31°38′13″S 115°44′46″E | "place of sweet water". |
| Ongerup | 33°57′58″S 118°29′10″E | "place of the male kangaroo". |
| Palgarup | 34°10′26″S 116°10′30″E | |
| Peringillup | 33°56′0″S 117°38′0″E | Not known. |
| Pingrup | 33°32′0″S 118°30′0″E | Believed to mean "grassy place". |
| Pootenup | 34°14′0″S 117°38′0″E | "place of the native hybrid mallee tree". |
| Porongurup | 34°39′50″S 117°52′26″E | |
| Qualeup | 33°50′0″S 116°48′0″E | The Aboriginal name of a nearby lake. |
| Quedjinup | 33.63°S 115.08°E | |
| Quigup | 33°58′0″S 115°42′0″E | Not known. |
| Quindalup | 33°32′0″S 116°00′0″E | "place of quendas" (Isoodon obesulus). |
| Takalarup | 34°36′S 118°2′E | |
| Tambellup | 34°02′28″S 117°38′31″E | possibly "place of thunder". |
| Wadjemup | 31°59′53″S 115°32′46″E | Noongar name for Rottnest Island, meaning "place across the water". |
| Wagerup | 32°56′53″S 115°54′18″E | "Place of emus". |
| Wannanup | 32°35′53″S 115°38′38″E | |
| Warawarrup | 33°02′53″S 115°54′43″E | |
| Wattleup | 32°10′12″S 115°49′26″E | Named for Wattleup Road. |
| Wilyabrup | 33°47′0″S 115°2′0″E | |
| Wokalup | 33°06′36″S 115°52′52″E | Not known. Humorously said to mean "the confusion experienced by nocturnal animals during an eclipse". |
| Wonnerup | 33°37′26″S 115°25′12″E | "place of the Aboriginal woman's digging or fighting stick". |
| Woogenellup | 34°31′48″S 117°49′41″E | |
| Yallingup | 33°38′24″S 115°01′41″E | Place of caves |
| Yalup Brook | 32°54′0″S 115°54′0″E | |
| Yangebup | 32°07′44″S 115°49′08″E | Derived from the Aboriginal word "yanget", the name of a native flax or bullrush. |
| Yoongarillup | 33°42′0″S 115°25′0″E | |
| Yornup | 34°03′22″S 116°10′12″E | |
| Yunderup | 32°34′34″S 115°47′28″E | Derived from "Yoondooroop", the original spelling of one of the islands in the Murray River delta. |

== See also ==
- Noongar for a map of the Noongar linguistic regions
