= Mobrup, Western Australia =

Locality in the Shire of Kojonup, Western Australia

Mobrup
- Interactive map of Mobrup
- Coordinates: 34.12574°S 116.92820°E
- Country: Australia
- State: Western Australia
- LGA: Shire of Kojonup
- Location: 261 km (162 mi) SE of Perth; 133 km (83 mi) NW of Albany; 40 km (25 mi) SW of Kojonup

Government
  - State electorate: Roe
  - Federal division: O'Connor

Area
  - Total: 318.6 km^{2} (123.0 sq mi)

Population
  - Total: 40 (SAL 2021)
- Postcode: 6395
Localities around Mobrup
Orchid Valley	Jingalup	Jingalup
Chowerup	Mobrup	Ryansbrook
Tonebridge	Frankland River	Frankland River

Mobrup is a rural locality of the Shire of Kojonup in the Great Southern region of Western Australia. The Tone River forms the majority of the north-western border of the locality. The Cootayerup, Mininup, Mongelup, Wandoora and Yetterup Nature Reserves are all located within Mobrup, as are two unnamed nature reserves.

== History ==
Mobrup and the Shire of Kojonup are located on the traditional land of the Kaniyang people of the Noongar nation.

The former Mobrup Pioneer Memorial Hall and the Furniss Homestead are both listed on the shire's heritage list. The Mobrup Pioneer Memorial Hall was built in 1959 but demolished in 2000. The Furniss Homestead was originally called Mobrub and gave its name to the locality. It was built by Frederick George and Emily Margaret Furniss, who established the property in 1909. The Furniss Homestead was a central meeting place for the district and served as telephone exchange, church and polling station.

== Nature reserves ==
The following nature reserves are located within Mobrup. All are located within the Jarrah Forest bioregion:

- Cootayerup Nature Reserve was gazetted on 16 July 1915 and has a size of 0.4 square kilometres (0.15 mi^{2}).
- Mininup Nature Reserve was gazetted on 13 April 1893 and has a size of 1.54 square kilometres (0.59 mi^{2}).
- Mongelup Nature Reserve was gazetted on 26 August 1904 and has a size of 0.39 square kilometres (0.15 mi^{2}).
- Wandoora Nature Reserve was gazetted on 10 November 1916 and has a size of 0.22 square kilometres (0.085 mi^{2}).
- Yetterup Nature Reserve was gazetted on 26 August 1904 and has a size of 1.15 square kilometres (0.44 mi^{2}).
- WA24057 Nature Reserve was gazetted on 22 October 1954 and has a size of 1.92 square kilometres (0.74 mi^{2}).
- WA36827 Nature Reserve was gazetted on 12 September 1980 and has a size of 0.19 square kilometres (0.073 mi^{2}).
