= Kulikup, Western Australia =

Locality in the Shire of Boyup Brook, Western Australia

Kulikup
- Town
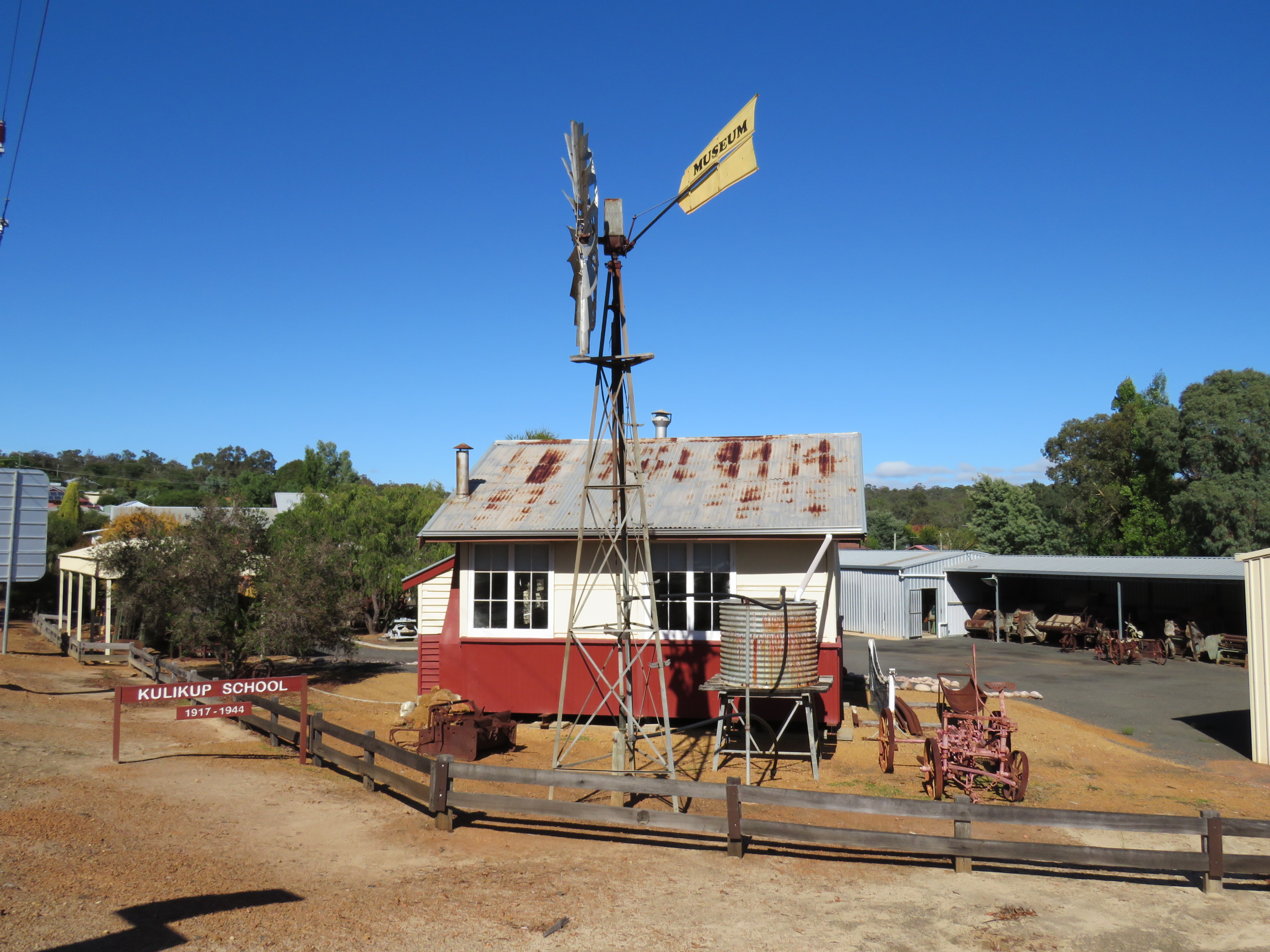
- The former Kulikup school and tennis club building, now located in Boyup Brook
- Coordinates: 33.83°S 116.68°E
- Country: Australia
- State: Western Australia
- LGA: Shire of Boyup Brook
- Location: 270 km (170 mi) from Perth; 141 km (88 mi) from Bunbury

Government
  - State electorate: Warren-Blackwood
  - Federal division: O'Connor

Area
  - Total: 283.4 km^{2} (109.4 sq mi)

Population
  - Total: 143 (SAL 2021)
- Postcode: 6244
Localities around Kulikup
Trigwell	Moodiarrup	Changerup
Dinninup	Kulikup	Qualeup
Mayanup	Scotts Brook	Qualeup

Kulikup is a rural locality and small town in the Shire of Boyup Brook in the South West region of Western Australia.

== History ==
Kulikup is located on the traditional land of the Kaneang (also spelt Kaniyang) people of the Noongar nation.

The locality is home to the state heritage-listed Norlup Homestead, constructed in 1872. European activities in the area dates back to 1839, when John Hassell acquired a temporary lease of the area to stock it with sheep without actually settling there. In 1854, William Scott and his wife Mary (née Keane) took up a lease and built a homestead, originally named "Rutherglen". Scott later questioned the local indigenous population about the original name of the area and was told it was Norlup, meaning "shady place" because of the trees surrounding fresh water pools, prompting him to rename the homestead.

The town of Kulikup was originally established in 1910 as a siding of the Boyup Brook to Kojonup railway line and named "Culicup". A town site was gazetted in 1912, now under the name of "Kulikupp", which was amended to the current spelling in 1965. The name itself comes from the nearby Culicup Pool, was first recorded in 1892 and is of Noongar origin but the meaning is unknown.

The former Kulikup School, built in 1917, was used as such until 1946, when it was relocated to the local sports ground and became the home of the Kulikup Tennis Club. In March 2002, the now heritage-listed building was relocated to the Boyup Brook Museum in Boyup Brook.
