= Qualeup, Western Australia =

Locality in the Shire of Kojonup, Western Australia

Qualeup
- Town
- Coordinates: 33.86028°S 116.82080°E
- Country: Australia
- State: Western Australia
- LGA(s): Shire of Kojonup
- Location: 229 km (142 mi) SE of Perth; 163 km (101 mi) NW of Albany; 32 km (20 mi) W of Kojonup
- Established: 1924

Government
  - State electorate(s): Roe
  - Federal division(s): O'Connor

Area
  - Total: 205.4 km^{2} (79.3 sq mi)

Population
  - Total(s): 72 (SAL 2021)
- Postcode: 6394
Localities around Qualeup
Kulikup	Changerup	Changerup
Scotts Brook	Qualeup	Muradup
Scotts Brook	Orchid Valley	Muradup

Qualeup is a town and locality of the Shire of Kojonup in the Great Southern region of Western Australia. Qualeup is located along the Boyup Brook-Kojonup Road. Lake Qualeup, after which the place is named, is located to the west of the townsite and locality, in neighbouring Kulikup.

== History ==
Qualeup and the Shire of Kojonup are located on the traditional land of the Kaniyang people of the Noongar nation.

Qualeup was once a siding on the Donnybrook-Katanning railway and opened in 1912. Prior to this, in 1910, land was set aside at Qualeup for a potential townsite, but it took until 1921 for enough interest to materialise and Qualeup was gazeeted as a townsite in October 1924. The town is named after nearby Lake Qualeup, with Qualeup being the local indigenous name for the lake.
