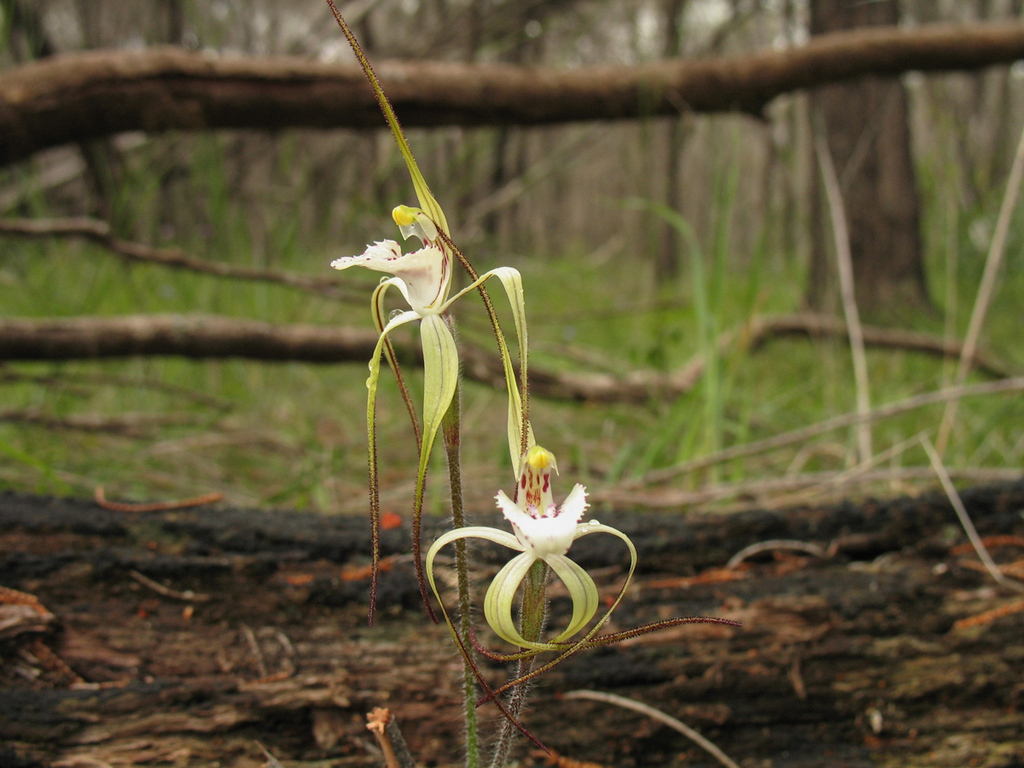
- Near Jingalup

Conservation status
- Endangered (EPBC Act)

Scientific classification
- Kingdom: Plantae
- Clade: Embryophytes
- Clade: Tracheophytes
- Clade: Spermatophytes
- Clade: Angiosperms
- Clade: Monocots
- Order: Asparagales
- Family: Orchidaceae
- Subfamily: Orchidoideae
- Tribe: Diurideae
- Genus: Caladenia
- Species: C. dorrienii

Binomial name
- Caladenia dorrienii Domin.

Synonyms
- Caladenia filamentosa var. dorrienii (Domin.) A.S.George; Calonema dorrienii (Domin.) D.L.Jones & M.A.Clem.; Jonesiopsis dorrienii (Domin.) D.L.Jones & M.A.Clem.

= Caladenia dorrienii =

Cossack spider orchid

Species of orchid

Caladenia dorrienii, commonly known as the Cossack spider orchid, is a species of orchid endemic to the south-west of Western Australia. It has a single hairy leaf and one, two or sometimes three small creamy-white flowers, usually with the lateral sepals and petals curving around the ovary and crossing each other. It is a rare orchid, only found in the extreme south-east of the state.

== Description ==
Caladenia dorrienii is a terrestrial, perennial, deciduous, herb with an underground tuber and which grows in clumps. It has a single, erect, narrow linear, hairy leaf, 6–10 cm (2–4 in) long and 3–7 mm (0.1–0.3 in) wide. One, two or sometimes three white to creamy-white flowers are borne on a stalk 10–25 cm (4–10 in) tall. The flowers are 4–5 cm (1.6–2.0 in) long and 2–3 cm (0.8–1 in) wide. The sepals and petals are relatively short, greenish-white with red lines and dark glandular tips. The dorsal sepal is erect and the lateral sepals and petals usually curve downwards and cross each other. The labellum is pale white, relatively broad and has smooth to slightly toothed edges. Along its centre line there are two rows of white or pale red-tipped calli. Flowering occurs from September to November.

== Taxonomy and naming ==
Caladenia dorrienii was first formally described by Karel Domin in 1912 from a specimen collected by Arthur Dorrien-Smith near Bridgetown. The description was published in Journal of the Linnean Society, Botany. The specific epithet (dorrienii) honours the collector of the type specimen.

== Distribution and habitat ==
The Cossack spider orchid is only found in scattered communities between Kojonup and Boyup Brook and near West Dale in the Avon Wheatbelt and Jarrah Forest biogeographic regions where it grows in moist clay soils amongst dense small plants in wandoo woodland.

== Conservation ==
Caladenia dorrienii is classified as "endangered" under the Australian Government Environment Protection and Biodiversity Conservation Act 1999 (EPBC Act) and as "rare flora" under the Western Australian Wildlife Conservation Act 1950.
