= Chowerup, Western Australia =

Locality in the Shire of Boyup Brook, Western Australia

Chowerup
- Suburb
- Coordinates: 34.08°S 116.68°E
- Country: Australia
- State: Western Australia
- LGA: Shire of Boyup Brook
- Location: 315 km (196 mi) from Perth; 152 km (94 mi) from Bunbury

Government
  - State electorate: Warren-Blackwood
  - Federal division: O'Connor

Area
  - Total: 348.9 km^{2} (134.7 sq mi)

Population
  - Total: 32 (SAL 2021)
- Postcode: 6244
Suburbs around Chowerup
Mayanup	Scotts Brook	Orchid Valley
Kingston	Chowerup	Mobrup
Perup	Tonebridge	Mobrup

Chowerup is a rural locality of the Shire of Boyup Brook in the South West region of Western Australia.

Chowerup is located on the traditional land of the Kaneang (also spelt Kaniyang) people of the Noongar nation.

The heritage-listed Chowerup Hall, dating back to 1923, is located within the locality, having functioned as a local school until 1950.
