= Changerup, Western Australia =

Locality in the Shire of Kojonup, Western Australia

Changerup
- other
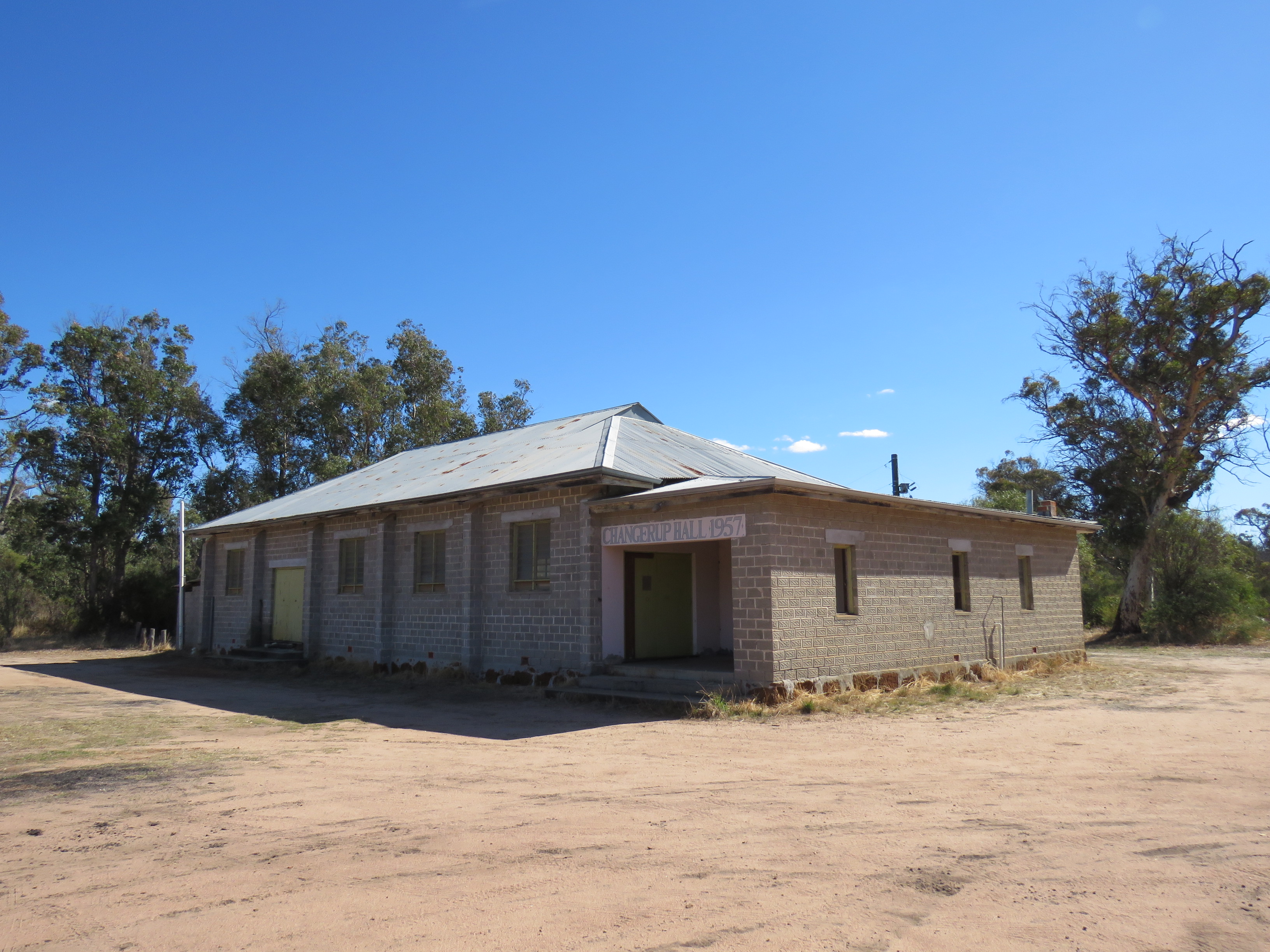
- The heritage listed Changerup Hall

- Coordinates: 33.73194°S 116.86470°E
- Country: Australia
- State: Western Australia
- LGA(s): Shire of Kojonup
- Location: 219 km (136 mi) SE of Perth; 172 km (107 mi) NW of Albany; 30 km (19 mi) NW of Kojonup

Government
  - State electorate(s): Roe
  - Federal division(s): O'Connor

Area
  - Total: 203 km^{2} (78 sq mi)

Population
  - Total(s): 60 (SAL 2021)
- Postcode: 6394
Localities around Changerup
Moodiarrup	Mokup	Boscabel
Kulikup	Changerup	Boilup
Qualeup	Muradup	Muradup

Changerup is a rural locality of the Shire of Kojonup in the Great Southern region of Western Australia. Changerup is located along the Collie-Changerup Road. The Balgarup River flows through Changerup, eventually forming its north-western boundary and reaching the Arthur River at the localities western-most point, where the two rivers converge to form the Blackwood River.

Changerup and the Shire of Kojonup are located on the traditional land of the Kaniyang people of the Noongar nation.

Changerup Hall, a community hall, is on the shire's heritage list and was built from 1953 and completed in 1957. Also on the shire's heritage list is Marinoni's House, which dates to 1912 and was built by Italian immigrants.
