= Scotts Brook, Western Australia =

Locality in the Shire of Boyup Brook, Western Australia

Scotts Brook
- Suburb
- Coordinates: 33.97°S 116.65°E
- Country: Australia
- State: Western Australia
- LGA: Shire of Boyup Brook
- Location: 308 km (191 mi) from Perth; 145 km (90 mi) from Bunbury

Government
  - State electorate: Warren-Blackwood
  - Federal division: O'Connor

Area
  - Total: 376.7 km^{2} (145.4 sq mi)

Population
  - Total: 89 (SAL 2021)
- Postcode: 6244
Suburbs around Scotts Brook
Mayanup	Kulikup	Qualeup
Mayanup	Scotts Brook	Orchid Valley
Chowerup	Chowerup	Chowerup

Scotts Brook is a rural locality of the Shire of Boyup Brook in the South West region of Western Australia.

Scotts Brook is located on the traditional land of the Kaneang (also spelt Kaniyang) people of the Noongar nation.
