= List of State Register of Heritage Places in the Shire of Kojonup =

List of heritage sites in the Shire of Kojonup in Western Australia

The State Register of Heritage Places is maintained by the Heritage Council of Western Australia. As of 2026, 91 places are heritage-listed in the Shire of Kojonup, of which three are on the State Register of Heritage Places.

== List ==
=== State Register of Heritage Places ===
The Western Australian State Register of Heritage Places, as of 2026, lists the following three state registered places within the Shire of Kojonup:

Place name	Place #	Street number	Street name	Suburb or town	Co-ordinates	Notes & former names	Photo
Kojonup Railway Station (former) Group (Kojunup Tourist Bureau)	1398	Lot 166	Gordon Street	Kojonup	33.83676°S 117.157593°E	Kojunup Tourist Bureau	
Elverd's Cottage	1400		Soldier Road	Kojonup	33.826017°S 117.153627°E		
Carrolup Native Settlement	10592		Mission Road	Kojonup	33.655°S 117.248°E	Marribank Children's Home, Marribank, Marribank Farm School, Marribank Mission Includes Carolup Aboriginal Cemetery, located in the Shire of Woodanilling	

=== Shire of Kojonup heritage-listed places ===
The following places are heritage listed in the Shire of Kojonup but are not State registered:

Place name	Place #	Street number	Street name	Suburb or town	Notes & former names	Photo
Police Quarters	1392		Albany Highway	Kojonup		
Royal Hotel	1393	81	Albany Highway	Kojonup		
Kojonup Road Board Office	1394		Albany Highway	Kojonup	The Women's Club	
R & I Bank (former)	1395	Corner	Gregory Street & Albany Highway	Kojonup	Bankwest	
St Bernard's Roman Catholic Church	1396		Katanning Road	Kojonup		
Masonic Hall	1397	15-17	Gordon Street	Kojonup	Masonic Lodge	
The Old Barracks	1399		Barracks Pl	Kojonup	Kojonup Military Barracks	
Old Church of England	1401		Church Street	Kojonup	Church of England Parish Hall, Old St Mary's Church	
Old School Community Centre	1402	Corner	Pensioner & Spring Streets	Kojonup	Old School - Kojonup	
Boscabel Hall	1403		Boscabel Road	Boscabel		
Jingalup Hall	1404		Jingalup Road	Jingalup		
Muradup Hall	1405		Piesse Street	Muradup		
RSL Hall and War Memorial	1406	Corner	Spencer Street & Albany Highway	Kojonup		
Kojonup Post Office (former)	3297	18-20	Spring Street	Kojonup	Kojonup Historical Society Headquarters	
Kojonup Memorial Hall	3411	97	Albany Highway	Kojonup		
Glen Lossie Homestead	3803	21294	Albany Highway	Kojonup		
Kojonup Memorial Church	4283	Corner	Spring & High Streets	Kojonup		
Grandad Elverds House	4548		Spring Street	Kojonup	Battistessa Dairy, Pensioner Guard Cottage	
Bailyes Mill	10572	Corner	Forsythe Street and Murby Place	Kojonup		
Balgarup	10573		Albany Highway South	Kojonup		
Bilney's House	10574	173	Albany Highway	Kojonup		
Carlecatup Railway Bridge over Carlecatup River	10575		Old Broomehill/Kojonup Road	Kojonup		
Cartwright's House	10576	8	McHenry Street	Kojonup	National Bank (former)	
Richardson's Store (former)	10577	116	Albany Highway	Kojonup	Kojonup Supermarket, Cheap Foods	
Chetwynd House	10578		Albany Highway	Kojonup	Dental Clinic and House	
Doreenup Homestead & Shearing Shed	10579		Katanning Road	Kojonup		
Drive-In Theatre (former)	10581		John Street	Kojonup	Kojonup Drive-In	
Farrar Dam	10582		Donnybrook Road	Kojonup		
Furniss Homestead	10583		Furniss Loop	Mobrup	Mobrup	
Jingalup Government Dam	10584		Frankland Road	Kojonup		
Hollywood House	10585			Cherry Tree Pool	Evelyn Farm	
Jingalup Golf Club	10586		Jingalup Road	Jingalup		
Jones Homestead	10587		Donnybrook Road	Kojonup	Wembley Park	
Old Ongerup	10588		Donnybrook Road	Kojonup	Treasurer's House	
Kojonup Post Office	10589		Albany Highway	Kojonup		
Korrinup	10590		Korrinup Road off Broomehill Road	Kojonup	Cornup	
Marinoni's House	10591		Marinoni Road	Changerup	Marinoni's Old House	
Mobrup Pioneer Memorial Hall	10593		Mobrup Road	Mobrup	Mobrup Hall	
Muradup Catholic Church	10594	Corner	Blackwood Road/Heggerty Street	Muradup	Mary Help of Christians	
Namarillup Well	10595		Albany Highway	Kojonup	Glen Lossie Well	
Narlingup Dam	10596		Donnybrook Road	Muradup	Narlingup Tank, 18 Mile Tank	
Old Kojonup Post and Telegraph House	10598	126	Albany Highway	Kojonup		
Quin Quin	10599	23	Honner Road	Kojonup	Baggs Place	
Riverdale Shearing Shed	10600		Riverdale Road	Muradup		
Kojonup Shire Administration Centre	10601	93-95	Albany Highway	Kojonup	Shire Offices	
Kojonup Showgrounds	10602		Donnybrook Road	Kojonup		
Spring Precinct	10603	Corner	Spring Street & Thorn Pl	Kojonup		
St Bernard's Convent	10604	10	Katanning Road	Kojonup	Adair's House	
St Mary's Anglican Church	10605	Corner	Albany Highway & Spring Street	Kojonup		
Kojonup Inn	10606	2	Pensioner Road	Kojonup		
Treasure's House	10607	152	Albany Highway	Kojonup		
van Zuilecom Grave, Railway Reserve	10608	Off	Broomehill & Korrinup Roads	Kojonup		
Jingalup War Memorial	10609		Jingalup Road	Jingalup		
Muradup War Memorial	10611		Donnybrook Road	Muradup		
Warkelup	10613		Broomehill Road	Kojonup		
Yeenyellup	10614		Frankland Road	Kojonup	Pardellup, Eenyellup	
Balgarup River Road Bridge	13075		Samson Road	Kojonup	MRWA 4313	
Kojonup Fire Station	14532		Albany Highway	Kojonup		
Commercial Hotel	14942		Albany Highway	Kojonup		
Kojonup Uniting Church	15096		Spencer Street	Kojonup		
Kojonup Police Station	17438	125	Albany Highway	Kojonup		
Doreenup Homestead	24477		Katanning Road	Kojonup		
Doreenup Shearing Shed	24533		Katanning Road	Kojonup		
Haddleton's House	25775	145	Albany Highway	Kojonup		
Thornbury's House	25776	7	Spencer Streetreet	Kojonup		
Cornwall House	25777	72	Albany Highway	Kojonup		
Kojonup Co-op	25778	113	Albany Highway	Kojonup		
Shops	25779	108A & 108B	Albany Highway	Kojonup		
Hallam's House	25780	155	Albany Highway	Kojonup		
Leabeter's House	25781	149	Albany Highway	Kojonup		
Norrish's House	25782	6	Blackwood Road	Kojonup		
Dr Abernethy's House	25783	74	Soldier Road	Kojonup		
Garage (Thornburys)	25784	96-98	Albany Highway	Kojonup		
Moss's Bakery	25785	128	Albany Highway	Kojonup		
Kojonup Cemetery	25845		Soldier Road	Kojonup		
Changerup Hall	25846	1812	Collie-Changerup Road	Changerup		
House (ruin)	25907	Lot 2	Soldier Road	Kojonup		
Kojonup Garage	25908		Albany Highway	Kojonup		
House	25959	35	Honner Street	Kojonup		
Arts and Crafts Shop	25960	106	Albany Highway	Kojonup	Shop	
Baptist Church	25964	32-34	Albany Highway	Kojonup		
Maybenup	25975	22327	Albany Highway	Kojonup		
Glen Lossie Shearing Shed	25977	21285	Albany Highway	Kojonup		
Kojonup CWA Memorial Centre	25985	129	Albany Highway	Kojonup		
Church of England Precinct	25986	2	Spring Street	Kojonup	Old Church of England Kojonup Memorial Church, St Mary's Anglican Church and Church Hall	
Cottages	25993	3 & 9	Delaney Street	Kojonup		
Bridge 0484 over Balgarup River, Murradup	25994		Donnybrook-Kojonup Road	Muradup		
MRWA Bridge 0057, over Balgarup River, Albany Highway, Kojonup	27232		Albany Highway	Kojonup		
