= Tonebridge, Western Australia =

Locality in the Shire of Boyup Brook, Western Australia

Tonebridge
- Town
- Coordinates: 34.23°S 116.71°E
- Country: Australia
- State: Western Australia
- LGA: Shire of Boyup Brook
- Location: 326 km (203 mi) from Perth; 163 km (101 mi) from Bunbury

Government
  - State electorate: Warren-Blackwood
  - Federal division: O'Connor

Area
  - Total: 247.3 km^{2} (95.5 sq mi)

Population
  - Total: 20 (SAL 2021)
- Postcode: 6244
Localities around Tonebridge
Chowerup	Chowerup	Mobrup
Perup	Tonebridge	Frankland River
Perup	Mordalup	Frankland River

Tonebridge is a rural locality and small town of the Shire of Boyup Brook in the South West region of Western Australia.

Tonebridge is located on the traditional land of the Kaneang (also spelt Kaniyang) people of the Noongar nation.

The town of Tonebridge was gazetted in 1961, with the town named after its location, a bridge of the Boyup Brook-Cranbrook Road over the Tone River.
