= List of heritage places in the Shire of Boyup Brook =

List of heritage sites in Western Australia

As of 2026, 45 places are heritage-listed in the Shire of Boyup Brook, of which one is on the State Register of Heritage Places. The State Register of Heritage Places is maintained by the Heritage Council of Western Australia.

== List ==
=== State Register of Heritage Places ===
The Western Australian State Register of Heritage Places, as of 2026, lists the following state registered place within the Shire of Boyup Brook:

Place name	Place #	Street name	Suburb or town	Co-ordinates	Built	State registered	Notes & former names	Photo
Norlup Homestead	229	Norlup Road	Kulikup	33.960854°S 116.557725°E	1872	24 March 1998		

=== Shire of Boyup Brook heritage-listed places ===
The following places are heritage listed in the Shire of Boyup Brook but are not State registered:

Place name	Place #	Street #	Street name	Suburb or town	Notes & former names	Photo
Agricultural Hall (former), Boyup Brook	222	Corner	Abel & Bridge Streets	Boyup Brook	Boyup Brook Tourist Centre, Infant Health Centre	
Boyup Brook Town Hall	224	Corner	Abel & Cowley Streets	Boyup Brook		
Commercial Bank of Australia (former)	225	Corner	Abel & Bridge Streets	Boyup Brook		
St Saviour's Anglican Church	226	Corner	Barron & Bridge Streets	Boyup Brook		
Condinup Homestead	227		Condinup Road	Boyup Brook		
Masonic Hall & Pioneer Museum	228		Jayes Road	Boyup Brook		
Boyup Brook Post Office	230		Railway Parade	Boyup Brook	inc: horse trough & tie rails	
Chowerup Hall	231		Cnr Pretty Gully Road & Westbourne Road	Chowerup		
First & Second Dinninup Halls	232			Dinninup		
Kulikup War Memorial Hall	234	11	Fraser Street	Kulikup		
Kulikup School (former)	235			Kulikup	Kulikup Tennis Club	
Mayanup Hall	236			Mayanup	Anglican Church Hall	
Wahkinup Hall	237	Corner	Foley & Boyup Brook Roads	Wahkinup	Wahkinup School, Dinninup Vale School, First Hall	
Wilga Uniting Church	238		Walker Road	Wilga	Wilga School	
Boyup Brook Police Station	3056		Abel Street	Boyup Brook		
Site of First Town Building	3151	Corner	Inglis & Barron Streets	Boyup Brook		
Jayes Homestead	3152		Jayes Road	Jayes Bridge		
Rylington Park	3153		Boyup Brook/Kojonup Road	Boyup Brook	Rylington Park Agricultural Research Institute	
Horse Trough and Tie Rails	3157		Railway Pde/Dickson Street	Boyup Brook		
Boyup Brook Railway Station Precinct	3159		Railway Pde/Dickson Street	Boyup Brook		
Trigwells Bridge over Blackwood River	3435		Boyup Brook-Arthur River Road	Trigwell		
Farm House	4654	Lot 2	Asplin Road	Boyup Brook		
Boyup Brook & District Soldiers Memorial Hospital & Honour Boards, WW1	4992		Hospital Drive	Boyup Brook		
Government Dam and Water Reserve	4993		William Street	Boyup Brook		
Gregory Tree	4994		Between Boyup Brook & Dinninup	Boyup Brook		
Dinninup Cemetery	4995			Dinninup		
Dinninup Brook Road Bridge	13111		Wahkinup Road	Boyup Brook	MRWA 3312	
Boyup Brook Fire Station (former) - site	14439		Abel Street	Boyup Brook		
Boyup Brook Fire Station	14440		Abel Street	Boyup Brook		
Chambers Bridge on Dinninup Brook	14562		Kulikup South Road	Boyup Brook	MRWA 3305 - closed	
Bank of New South Wales (NSW)(former)	14779	Corner	Bridge & Abel Streets	Boyup Brook		
Boyup Brook Hotel	14918	74	Abel Street	Boyup Brook		
Boyup Brook Church	15012		Cowley Street	Boyup Brook		
Boyup Brook War Memorial, WW1 & WW2	15632		Abel Street	Boyup Brook		
Sandakan Ranau Memorial, WW2	15633		Abel Street	Boyup Brook		
Wilga Mill Precinct	16751		Charteris Road	Wilga		
Boyup Brook Flax Mill	16791	112	Jackson Street	Boyup Brook	Flaxmill Recreation Camp	
Boyup Brook Police Station & Courthouse	17358		Abel Street	Boyup Brook		
Chowerup Primary School (former)	19848		Cnr Pretty Gully & Tuckett Roads	Chowerup		
House, 27 Railway Parade	23788	27	Railway Parade	Boyup Brook		
Railway Barracks	23882		Railway Parade	Boyup Brook		
Boyup Brook Railway Station	24416		Railway Parade	Boyup Brook		
Cootamundra, McAlinden	26941	984	McAlinden Road	McAlinden	Smith Homestead, McAlinden	
House & Farm, 817 McAlinden Road, McAlinden	27032	817	McAlinden Road	McAlinden		
