= Ryansbrook, Western Australia =

Locality in the Shire of Kojonup, Western Australia

Ryansbrook
- other
- Coordinates: 34.10111°S 117.13830°E
- Country: Australia
- State: Western Australia
- LGA(s): Shire of Kojonup
- Location: 267 km (166 mi) SE of Perth; 123 km (76 mi) NW of Albany; 28 km (17 mi) S of Kojonup

Government
  - State electorate(s): Roe
  - Federal division(s): O'Connor

Area
  - Total: 167 km^{2} (64 sq mi)

Population
  - Total(s): 56 (SAL 2021)
- Postcode: 6395
Localities around Ryansbrook
Jingalup	Lumeah	Lumeah
Mobrup	Ryansbrook	Lumeah
Frankland River	Frankland River	Cranbrook

Ryansbrook is a rural locality of the Shire of Kojonup in the Great Southern region of Western Australia.

Ryansbrook and the Shire of Kojonup are located on the traditional land of the Kaniyang people of the Noongar nation.
