= Orchid Valley, Western Australia =

Locality in the Shire of Kojonup, Western Australia

Orchid Valley
- Interactive map of Orchid Valley
- Coordinates: 34.00629°S 116.82620°E
- Country: Australia
- State: Western Australia
- LGA: Shire of Kojonup
- Location: 241 km (150 mi) SE of Perth; 154 km (96 mi) NW of Albany; 38 km (24 mi) SW of Kojonup

Government
  - State electorate: Roe
  - Federal division: O'Connor

Area
  - Total: 224.7 km^{2} (86.8 sq mi)

Population
  - Total: 27 (SAL 2021)
- Postcode: 6394
Localities around Orchid Valley
Scotts Brook	Qualeup	Muradup
Chowerup	Orchid Valley	Jingalup
Chowerup	Mobrub	Mobrub

Orchid Valley is a rural locality of the Shire of Kojonup in the Great Southern region of Western Australia. The Tone River forms the south-eastern border of the locality. The Mettabinup Nature Reserve is located within Orchid Valley.

Orchid Valley and the Shire of Kojonup are located on the traditional land of the Kaniyang people of the Noongar nation.

== Nature reserve ==
The Mettabinup Nature Reserve was gazetted on 1 May 1914, has a size of 1.64 square kilometres (0.63 mi^{2}), and is located within the Jarrah Forest bioregion.
