= McAlinden, Western Australia =

Locality in the Shire of Boyup Brook, Western Australia

McAlinden
- Suburb
- Coordinates: 33.61°S 116.31°E
- Country: Australia
- State: Western Australia
- LGA: Shire of Boyup Brook
- Location: 233 km (145 mi) from Perth; 83 km (52 mi) from Bunbury

Government
  - State electorate: Warren-Blackwood
  - Federal division: O'Connor

Area
  - Total: 278 km^{2} (107 sq mi)

Population
  - Total: 70 (SAL 2021)
- Postcode: 6225
Suburbs around McAlinden
| Cardiff | Bowelling | Bowelling |
| Noggerup | McAlinden | Trigwell |
| Wilga | Benjinup | Dinninup |

McAlinden is a rural locality of the Shire of Boyup Brook in the South West region of Western Australia.

McAlinden is located on the traditional land of the Kaneang (also spelt Kaniyang) people of the Noongar nation.

The locality contains two heritage-listed homesteads, the house and farm at 817 McAlinden Road and the Cootamundra homestead, built in 1932, with the buildings being opposite each other on McAlinden Road.

The north-western corner of McAlinden is home to the Greater Preston National Park, also referred to as Preston National Park, which primarily stretches across the localities of McAlinden and Noggerup.
