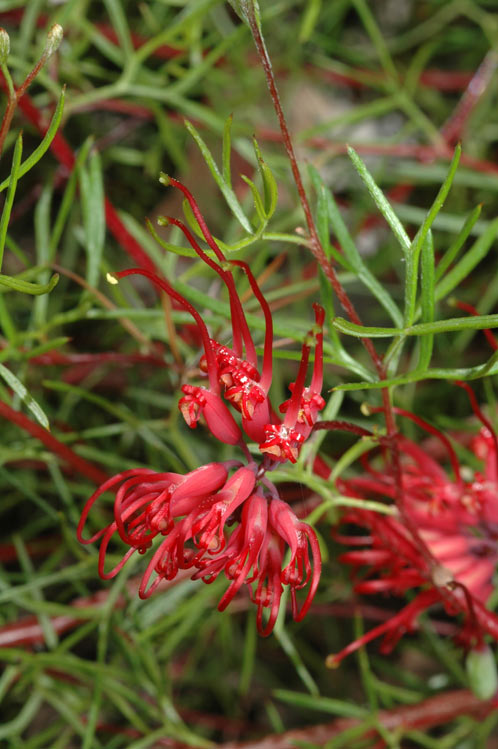

Conservation status
- Endangered (IUCN 3.1)

- Endangered (EPBC Act)

Scientific classification
- Kingdom: Plantae
- Clade: Embryophytes
- Clade: Tracheophytes
- Clade: Spermatophytes
- Clade: Angiosperms
- Clade: Eudicots
- Order: Proteales
- Family: Proteaceae
- Genus: Grevillea
- Species: G. acropogon

Binomial name
- Grevillea acropogon Makinson

= Grevillea acropogon =

Species of shrub endemic to Western Australia

Grevillea acropogon is a species of flowering plant in the family Proteaceae and is endemic to a restricted part of southwestern Western Australia. It is a prostrate to erect shrub with pinnatisect leaves with five to seven sharply-pointed lobes, and red flowers.

== Description ==
Grevillea acropogon is a prostrate to erect shrub that grows to a height of up to 1.8 m (5 ft 11 in) with softly-hairy young branchlets. The leaves are 15–25 mm (0.59–0.98 in) long and pinnatisect with five to seven lobes, sometimes the lobes further divided. The lobes are linear, sharply-pointed, 10–18 mm (0.39–0.71 in) long and 0.8–1.1 mm (0.031–0.043 in) wide. The flowers are red and arranged in groups of 18 to 24 on a flowering stem 12–17 mm (0.47–0.67 in) long, each flower on a pedicel 2.0–2.5 mm (0.079–0.098 in) long, the pistil 18–22 mm (0.71–0.87 in) long. Flowering occurs from June to September.

== Taxonomy ==
Grevillea acropogon was first formally described in 2000 by Robert Owen Makinson in the Flora of Australia based on material collected near Lake Unicup, west of Frankland, in 1996. The specific epithet (acrobotrya) means "bearded at the end".

== Distribution and habitat ==
This grevillea is only known from two disjunct subpopulations in south-western Australia. It was once only known from the type location near Lake Unicup, approximately 30km west of the small town of Frankland River. However, there is a more recently discovered subpopulation within the Kulikup area, east of Boyup Brook. The species is recorded as growing in shallow soils on the slopes of ironstone on the margins of seasonally inundated areas. The sites receive a high natural rainfall and frequently have surface water running over them.

== Conservation status ==
Grevillea acropogon is listed as endangered under the Australian Government Environment Protection and Biodiversity Conservation Act 1999, as threatened flora (declared rare flora — extant) by the Department of Biodiversity, Conservation and Attractions and as endangered on the IUCN Red List of Threatened Species. The main threats to the species include damage by vehicles, drought, trampling by kangaroos and changes in hydrology.
