= Muradup, Western Australia =

Locality in the Shire of Kojonup, Western Australia

Muradup
- Town
- Coordinates: 33.85°S 116.983°E
- Country: Australia
- State: Western Australia
- LGA(s): Shire of Kojonup
- Location: 266 km (165 mi) south east of Perth; 17 km (11 mi) west of Kojonup
- Established: 1907

Government
  - State electorate(s): Roe
  - Federal division(s): O'Connor

Area
  - Total: 172.7 km^{2} (66.7 sq mi)
- Elevation: 261 m (856 ft)

Population
  - Total(s): 97 (SAL 2021)
- Postcode: 6394
Localities around Muradup
Changerup	Boilup	Boilup
Qualeup	Muradup	Kojonup
Orchid Valley	Jingalup	Jingalup

Muradup is a small town and locality in the Shire of Kojonup, Great Southern region of Western Australia. Muradup is located between Kojonup and Boyup Brook, and is situated along the Balgarup River. The Narlingup Nature Reserve is located in the west of Muradup.

== History ==
Muradup and the Shire of Kojonup are located on the traditional land of the Kaniyang people of the Noongar nation.

Settlers had appeared in the area in the 1850s but it was not until 1899 that land was set aside for a townsite. The Shire of Kojonup requested for lots to be surveyed in 1905; this was carried out in 1906 and the town was gazetted in 1907 as Muradupp. More land was opened for selection in the area in 1909.

A railway siding existed in the town of Muradup as well as at Narlingup, further west, on the Donnybrook-Katanning railway.

In 1913 the local progress association asked for a school to be erected on a block that had been set aside in the town.

The lands department changed the name of the town from Muradupp to Muradup after deciding the double P at the end of the name was superfluous.

Land was granted in the area to returned soldiers in 1918. The first soldier to receive land was O. Fitzpatrick, who received 1,160 acres of land that had been confiscated from an "alien enemy subject" who had been interned.

The town was named after the nearby Mooradupp pool, which was first recorded in 1846 when the area was surveyed. The name is Aboriginal in origin but the meaning is not known.

== Nature reserve ==
The Narlingup Nature Reserve was gazetted on 27 March 1903, has a size of 1.45 square kilometres (0.56 sq mi), and is located within the Jarrah Forest bioregion. The heritage listed Narlingup Dam is located within the nature reserve. It is a natural water source but has been improved to function as a reliable water source for horse transport and, later, the railway line passing through..
