= Boscabel, Western Australia =

Locality in the Shire of Kojonup, Western Australia

Boscabel
- Town
- Coordinates: 33°40′S 117°04′E
- Country: Australia
- State: Western Australia
- LGA(s): Shire of Kojonup
- Location: 238 km (148 mi) south east of Perth; 21 km (13 mi) north of Kojonup
- Established: 1913

Government
  - State electorate(s): Roe
  - Federal division(s): O'Connor

Area
  - Total: 201.4 km^{2} (77.8 sq mi)

Population
  - Total(s): 71 (SAL 2021)
- Postcode: 6394
Localities around Boscabel
Mokup	Beaufort River	Kenmare
Changerup	Boscabel	Cherry Tree Pool
Boilup	Kojonup	Cherry Tree Pool

Boscabel is a town and locality in the Shire of Kojonup, Great Southern region of Western Australia, located north of Kojonup. The Albany Highway passes through the locality, but not the townsite, from north to south.

Boscabel and the Shire of Kojonup are located on the traditional land of the Kaniyang people of the Noongar nation.

The town was gazetted in 1913, following a suggestion to do so by the local progress association in 1912.

It is believed that the town is named after Boscobel House in Shropshire.

Boscabel Hall is on the shire's heritage list and dates back to 1917. The timber building was officially opened by the Premier of Western Australia, James Mitchell, in July 1919. It was used as a school, for church services and social gatherings and is still in use today.
