= Boilup, Western Australia =

Locality in the Shire of Kojonup, Western Australia

Boilup
- Interactive map of Boilup
- Coordinates: 33.76389°S 117.02220°E
- Country: Australia
- State: Western Australia
- LGA: Shire of Kojonup
- Location: 232 km (144 mi) SE of Perth; 158 km (98 mi) NW of Albany; 10 km (6.2 mi) NW of Kojonup

Government
  - State electorate: Roe
  - Federal division: O'Connor

Area
  - Total: 106.6 km^{2} (41.2 sq mi)

Population
  - Total: 32 (SAL 2021)
- Postcode: 6394
Localities around Boilup
Changerup	Boscabel	Boscabel
Changerup	Boilup	Kojonup
Muradup	Muradup	Kojonup

Boilup is a rural locality of the Shire of Kojonup in the Great Southern region of Western Australia. Boilup is located along the Collie-Changerup Road.

Boilup and the Shire of Kojonup are located on the traditional land of the Kaniyang people of the Noongar nation.

== Climate ==
The area has a moderate Mediterranean climate, which is the prevailing climate in the Great Southern region. According to the Köppen climate classification, the local climate is classified as Mediterranean (Csb), characterized by mild to warm and relatively dry summers, and cool to mild winters during which most of the annual precipitation occurs.

The region experiences relatively dry summers with moderate temperatures compared to more inland areas, while winters are wetter, with regular rainfall that supports agricultural activities. Its location in southwestern Australia contributes to generally moderate climatic conditions and reduces extreme temperature fluctuations.
