= Lumeah, Western Australia =

Locality in the Shire of Kojonup, Western Australia

Lumeah
- other
- Coordinates: 33°59′55″S 117°14′15″E
- Country: Australia
- State: Western Australia
- LGA(s): Shire of Kojonup
- Location: 259 km (161 mi) SE of Perth; 131 km (81 mi) NW of Albany; 18 km (11 mi) S of Kojonup

Government
  - State electorate(s): Roe
  - Federal division(s): O'Connor

Area
  - Total: 326.2 km^{2} (125.9 sq mi)

Population
  - Total(s): 86 (SAL 2021)
- Postcode: 6395
Localities around Lumeah
Jingalup	Kojonup	Broomehill West
Jingalup	Lumeah	Broomehill West
Ryansbrook	Cranbrook	Borderdale

Lumeah is a locality of the Shire of Kojonup, Great Southern region of Western Australia. The Albany Highway passes through Lumeah from north-west to south-east.

Lumeah and the Shire of Kojonup are located on the traditional land of the Kaniyang people of the Noongar nation.
