= Jingalup, Western Australia =

Locality in the Shire of Kojonup, Western Australia

Jingalup
- Town
- Interactive map of Jingalup
- Coordinates: 33°58′S 117°02′E
- Country: Australia
- State: Western Australia
- LGA: Shire of Kojonup
- Location: 275 km (171 mi) SE of Perth; 19 km (12 mi) SW of Kojonup
- Established: 1924

Government
  - State electorate: Roe
  - Federal division: O'Connor

Area
  - Total: 395.2 km^{2} (152.6 sq mi)
- Elevation: 296 m (971 ft)

Population
  - Total: 139 (SAL 2021)
- Postcode: 6395
Localities around Jingalup
Muradup	Kojonup	Kojonup
Orchid Valley	Jingalup	Lumeah
Mobrup	Mobrup	Ryansbrook

Jingalup is a town and locality in the Shire of Kojonup, Great Southern region of Western Australia. Jingalup is located between the towns of Kojonup and Cranbrook, on Murrin Brook, which is a tributary of the Tone River. The locality is home to the Jingalup and South Jingalup Nature Reserves.

== History ==
Jingalup and the Shire of Kojonup are located on the traditional land of the Kaniyang people of the Noongar nation.

The area was explored by Francis Thomas Gregory in 1846; he first recorded the name Jingalup. The area was eventually opened to agriculture. By 1918 the local farmers requested that a townsite be declared, and proposed the name be Mylerup. A town hall which was also used as a school and a recreation ground had been built by 1922, and the community knew the area as Jingalup. The town was gazetted in 1924.

The name is Aboriginal in origin and is a contraction of the name of a nearby well, Kodjingalup Well.

The Jingalup Hall, Golf Club and War Memorial are on the shire's heritage list. The Jingalup School in 1919, with a new building constructed in 1954 that served as a school until 1974. This building was subsequently moved and is now used as the golf club.

== Nature reserves ==
The Jingalup Nature Reserve was gazetted on 15 July 1921, has a size of 4.27 square kilometres (1.65 mi^{2}), and is located within the Jarrah Forest bioregion. The South Jingalup Nature Reserve was also gazetted on 15 July 1921, has a size of 5.51 square kilometres (2.13 mi^{2}), and is also located within the Jarrah Forest bioregion.
