= Donnybrook to Katanning railway line =

Former railway line in Western Australia

Donnybrook–Katanning railway
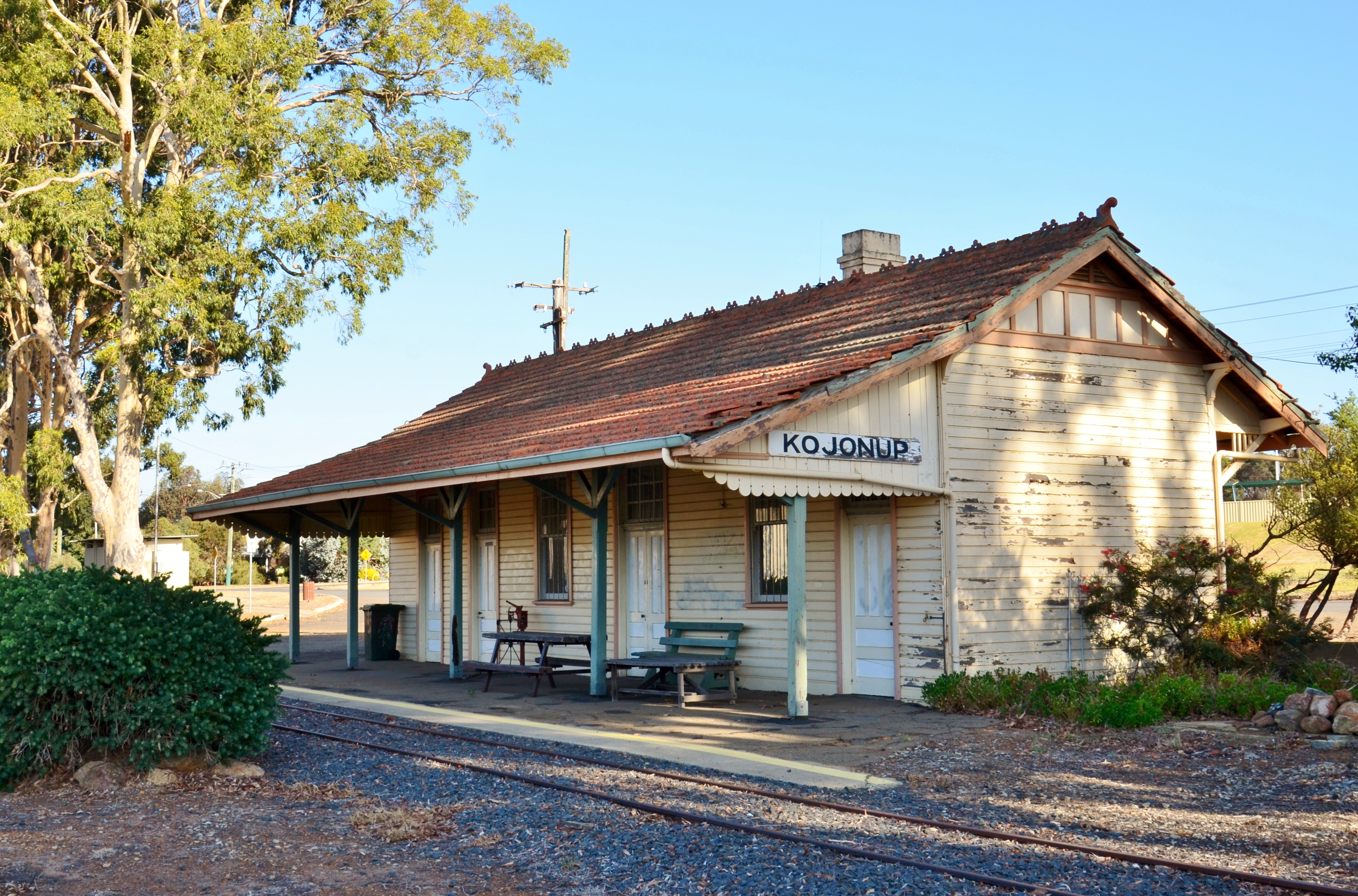
- The State heritage-listed Kojonup railway station

Overview
- Status: Closed
- Owner: Government of Western Australia
- Locale: South West and Great Southern regions, Western Australia
- Termini: Donnybrook; Katanning

Service
- Operator(s): Western Australian Government Railways

History
- Commenced: 1906
- Opened: 21 May 1912
- Closed: 1 June 1982

Technical
- Line length: 212 km (132 mi)
- Track gauge: 1,067 mm (3 ft 6 in)
- Donnybrook–Katanning railway Main locations

The Donnybrook–Katanning railway was a railway line in the South West and Great Southern regions of Western Australia, between Donnybrook and Katanning.

At times of the proposal of the railway, the project was known as the Upper Blackwood railway.

It connected the Great Southern Railway route with Donnybrook, providing railway access for farmers in the region.

== History ==
The railway line was constructed in stages, and not as one continuous project. Katanning had been connected to the Great Southern Railway by 1889 but Kojonup had been bypassed by the line and argued for a rail connection to the network. The Katanning to Kojonup section was surveyed in late 1905, construction commenced the following year and was completed in March 1907. The Katanning-Kojonup line was officially opened on 10 April 1907 but, at this point, only the railway line existed and no buildings or platforms.

With the arrival of the railway at Kojonup, towns further west lobbied for extending the line to Boyup Brook and on to Donnybrook to connect to the South Western Railway via the Northcliffe railway line. The Donnybrook to Noggerup section opened to traffic on 26 March 1908, followed by the Noggerupp to Boyup Brook section, which opened on 10 March 1909. The final link, the Boyup Brook to Kojonup section, opened to traffic on 21 May 1912. Construction of the line was put out to public tender but the Western Australian Public Works Department was found to be the cheapest bidder and was tasked with the building of the various sections of the line with the exception of the Boyup Brook to Kojonup link, which was carried out by a private company. The length of the railway line from Donnybrook to Katanning was 212 kilometres (132 mi).

In 1926, through the Boyup Brook–Cranbrook Railway Act 1926, a railway connection from the Donnybrook–Katanning railway to the Great Southern Railway was approved, from Boyup Brook to Cranbrook. Construction of this line was started but never completed.

Regular passenger services on the railway line continued until the late 1960s, when road transport overtook the railway in popularity, but special passenger services operated on the line until 1974. Freight services continued until the early 1980s, but the line was seasonally closed in 1981. In early 1982, extensive flooding damaged the line around Muradup and the decision was made to close the railway line, which took effect on 1 June 1982.

Boyup Brook and Kojonup were significant locations on the railway.

The section of the railway between Donnybrook and Boyup Brook is now held under a 49-year lease by Arc Infrastructure, having been included in the privatisation of Westrail freight in 2000. The section from Boyup Brook to Katanning remains under the control of the Public Transport Authority.

== Acts of Parliament ==
The Katanning–Kojonup Railway Act 1905, an act by the Parliament of Western Australia granted assent on 23 December 1905, authorised the construction of the railway line from Katanning to Kojonup. A second act, the Donnybrook–Preston Valley Railway Act 1906, assented to in 14 December 1906, authorised the construction of the railway line from Donnybrook to Boyup Brook. A third act, the Boyup–Kojonup Railway Act 1909, assented to in 21 December 1909, authorised the construction of the railway line from Boyup Brook to Kojonup.

== Other railway lines ==
Other connecting lines north of this line were the:

- Brunswick Junction to Wagin railway
- Brunswick Junction to Narrogin railway line via Bowelling
- Pinjarra to Narrogin railway

These lines were mostly closed and removed, the Brunswick Junction to Collie railway line being the last remaining active line.

== Legacy ==
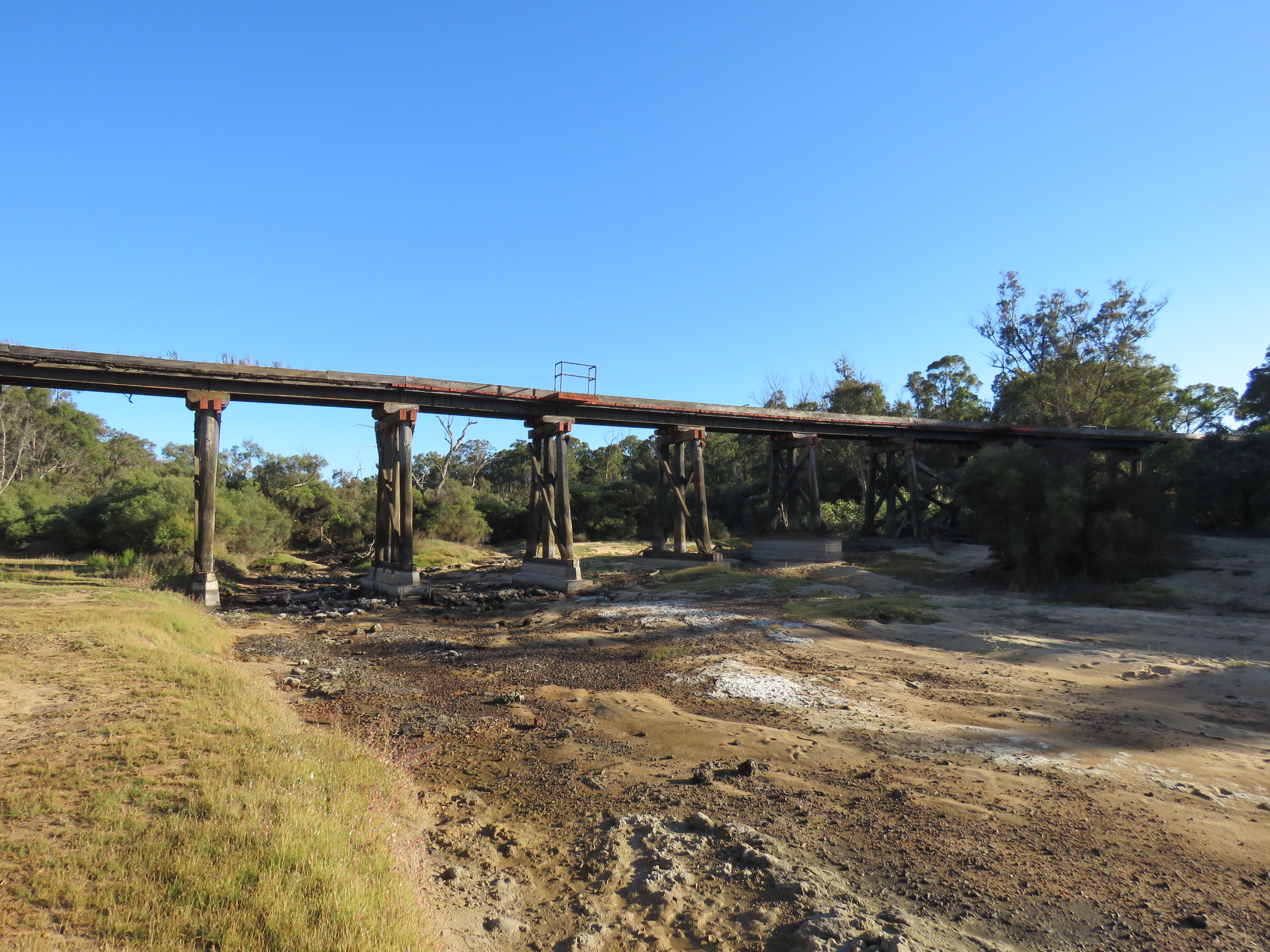
The railway bridge of the Donnybrook–Katanning line over the Blackwood River at Boyup Brook, locally referred to as the Skeleton Bridge

Historically, the railway line led through the Shires of Donnybrook–Balingup, Boyup Brook, Kojonup and Katanning. Of the infrastructure in these shires, the Donnybrook Railway Precinct and the Kojonup railway station are on the Western Australian State Register of Heritage Places.

Further to this, the Boyup Brook Railway Station Precinct, consisting of the Railway Barracks and the Boyup Brook Railway Station, are on the Shire of Boyup Brook's heritage list. In the east of the Shire of Kojonup, the Carlecatup Railway Bridge over the Carlecatup River is on the shire's heritage list. In the Shire of Katanning, the Katanning Railway Station is on the shire's heritage list, but dates back to 1889, before the establishment of the Donnybrook–Katanning railway.
