= Robert Moir =

Medical researcher

- Born: Robert David Moir; 2 April 1961; Kojonup, West Australia, Australia
- Died: 20 December 2019 (aged 58); Milton, Massachusetts, US
- Education: University of Western Australia; University of Melbourne
- Known for: Biochemical and cellular mechanisms in neurodegeneration in Alzheimer's disease
- Spouses: Julie Alperen; Elena Vaillancourt
- Children: 3
- Scientific career
- Thesis: Characterisation of the amyloid protein precursor of Alzheimer's disease (1996)
- Doctoral advisor: Colin L Masters

Robert David Moir (2 April 1961 – 20 December 2019) was an Australian-born medical research scientist who theorized that the over-accumulation of beta-amyloid, which had formed to protect the brain against microbes, aided the development of Alzheimer's disease in the human brain.

== Early life ==
He was born in Kojonup in Western Australia to Terrence and Mary Moir who were farmers and had three siblings, Margaret, Andrew and Catherine. He said he only learnt to read and write at age twelve but became an avid reader of all things scientific.

== Education ==
On completion of high school, he studied biochemistry at the University of Western Australia with one of his microbiology lecturers being Nobel Prize winner Dr Barry Marshall, who discovered that H. pylori cause ulcers. He received his PHD in 1996 from the University of Melbourne, supervised by neuropathologist Dr Colin L. Masters.

== Career ==
Moir immigrated to the United States in 1994 to work in Rudolph Tanzi's laboratory at Harvard University as an Alzheimer's biochemist. He had met Tanzi at a medical conference in Amsterdam. Moir was also able to purify and produce quantities of the molecule which the brain used to make the beta-amyloid. He concentrated initially in Tanzi's work on establishing what genes affected the risk of Alzheimer's disease. He continued working for Tanzi as a post-doctoral fellow and would eventually become an assistant professor in neurology at Harvard Medical School and the Massachusetts General Hospital and his own laboratory at the institution.

In 2007 he came across a research article about an antimicrobial peptide called LL37 that killed viruses, fungi and bacteria in the brain and which he thought could be a twin of the beta-amyloid, another antimicrobial. Tanzi's work at the time focused on genes that increased the risk of getting Alzheimer's disease and the inbuilt ability of some to fight germs so Moir proposed that beta-amyloid might have an anti-microbial effect in Alzheimer's. The theory was that the beta-amyloid creates a plaque that captures the dangerous microbes and protects the brain but too much build-up of the plaque could become toxic and cause Alzheimer's disease to develop. Tanzi encouraged Moir to continue research into the use of beta-amyloids to kill pathogens, funding it out of the former's research funding. He succeeded in this theory 2009 when he finally replicated the process in vitro. The next step was testing the theory in Alzheimer's and in healthy brain tissue; he attempted to publish the results in Science and three other journals and was rejected, but finally succeeded in 2010.

In 2010 funding was given to fund himself, a doctoral student and $400 worth of mice. Testing confirmed his hypothesis in live Alzheimer's mice and he then attempted to publish in six journals in 2014 but was rejected by peers. The paper would eventually be published in 2016 by the journal Science Translational Medicine. When the research article was published in 2016, it was regarded as one of the top five advances in neurology for that year.

In 2016, he attempted to gain funding from the National Institutes of Health (NIH) to research whether herpes simplex virus 1 (HSV-1), which causes cold sores and can reach the brain, that might promote both amyloid plaques and tau tangles but was rejected when the third funding reviewer criticized the proposed research as being a possible minor cause of Alzheimer's, Moir's status as less than a full professor, and his poor prior funding. He would later be funded by CureAlz and again attempted to publish in 2017, before finally being published in 2018.

Moir struggled for many years to obtain funding for his research, like many in his field, as those reviewing funding applications and those vetting papers for possible publication viewed alternative explanations for the causes of Alzheimer's Disease as misguided. In 2006 he received funding from the NIH/National Institute on Aging (NIA) for targeting cross-linked amyloid protein species as a therapy for Alzheimer's Disease. In 2010 further funding from NIH/National Institute of Allergy and Infectious Diseases (NIAID) for the study, Abeta protein of Alzheimer's Disease is an antimicrobial peptide and in 2019, again from the NIH/NIA, for research into the Antimicrobial activities of Abeta in Alzheimer's disease brain.

Another request for a grant from the NIH in 2018 for further research into the herpes virus and Alzheimer's was rejected, before money was found in early 2019.

At the time of his death, he was an assistant professor of neurology at Massachusetts General Hospital and Harvard Medical School. The Moir Lab focused on the biochemical and cellular mechanisms involved in neurodegeneration in Alzheimer's disease and ageing.

== Marriage ==
Moir was married twice. First to Elena Vaillancourt from whom he divorced in 2004, and secondly to Julie Alperen.

== Death ==
Moir died in a hospice in Milton, Massachusetts from the effects of glioblastoma. He had three children; Alexander Moir, with his first wife Elena Vaillancourt, and Maxwell and Holly with his wife, Julie Alperen.

== Work(s) ==
- Alzheimer's Disease - Amyloid-b peptide protects against microbial infection in mouse and worm models of Alzheimer's disease
