= Dinninup, Western Australia =

Dinninup
- Town
- Coordinates: 33.816°S 116.533°E
- Country: Australia
- State: Western Australia
- LGA(s): Shire of Boyup Brook
- Location: 283 km (176 mi) SSE of Perth; 17 km (11 mi) E of Boyup Brook
- Established: 1915

Government
  - State electorate(s): Warren-Blackwood
  - Federal division(s): O'Connor

Area
  - Total: 347.4 km^{2} (134.1 sq mi)
- Elevation: 212 m (696 ft)

Population
  - Total(s): 161 (SAL 2021)
- Postcode: 6244

Dinninup is a small town in the South West region of Western Australia. It is between Boyup Brook and Kojonup.

The town's name is Aboriginal in origin and is the name of a brook that is situated close to town. The name was first recorded by surveyors in 1877; the meaning is unknown. The original settlement was "Darling Hill" home to Thomas and Rebecca Draper (née Scott) daughter of the first settlers in Boyup Brook. Originating as a railway station on the Boyup Brook to Kojonup line, the land was requested by early settlers to be set aside for a townsite in 1906. The line was completed in 1910 and the Dinninup station was opened at the same time. The town was gazetted in 1915.

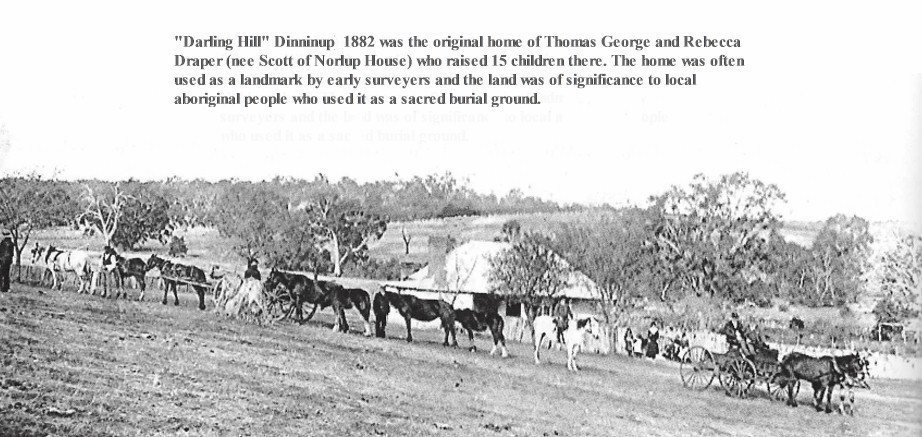
Darling Hill Homestead 1882
