= Hookbill =

Hookbill could refer to

- Hook Bill, a breed of domestic ducks
- the avicultural term for members of the parrot family (typically anything larger than a parakeet) based on the curved shape of the bill, distinguishing them from softbills and other birds such as doves and finches
- Lanaʻi hookbill (Dysmorodrepanis munroi) an extinct Hawaiian finch
- The chestnut-winged hookbill (Ancistrops strigilatus), of western Amazonia
