= Shire of Boyup Brook =

Coordinates: 33°50′02″S 116°23′17″E

- Local government area
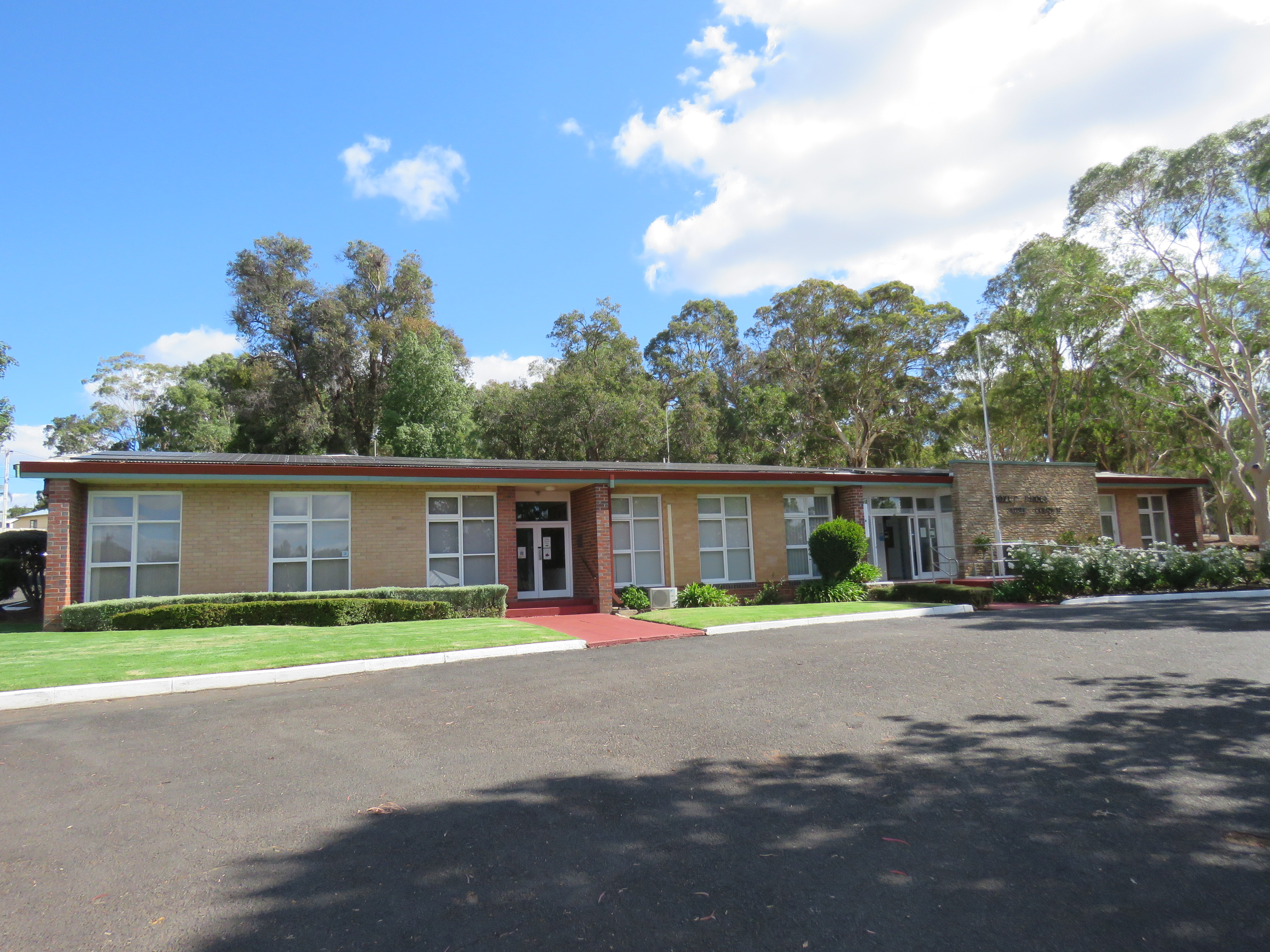
- The Boyup Brook shire offices in April 2022

- Interactive map of Shire of Boyup Brook
- Country: Australia
- State: Western Australia
- Region: South West
- Established: 1896
- Council seat: Boyup Brook

Government
  - Shire President: Helen O'Connell
  - State electorate: Warren-Blackwood
  - Federal division: O'Connor

Area
  - Total: 2,829.2 km^{2} (1,092.4 sq mi)

Population
  - Total: 1,834 (LGA 2021)
- Website: Shire of Boyup Brook
LGAs around Shire of Boyup Brook
Donnybrook Balingup	West Arthur	West Arthur
Donnybrook Balingup	Shire of Boyup Brook	Kojonup
Bridgetown Greenbushes	Manjimup	Cranbrook

The Shire of Boyup Brook is a local government area located in the South West region of Western Australia, about 270 kilometres (168 mi) southeast of Perth, the state capital. The Shire covers an area of 2,829 square kilometres (1,092 sq mi) and its seat of government is the town of Boyup Brook.

== History ==
The Upper Blackwood Road District was gazetted on 17 July 1896. On 1 July 1961, it became the Shire of Upper Blackwood under the Local Government Act 1960 and on 30 May 1969 changed its name to the Shire of Boyup Brook.

== Indigenous people ==
The Shire of Boyup Brook is located on the traditional land of the Bibbulmun and/or (Note: Sources differ) Kaniyang people of the Noongar nation.

The shire's name is derived from the Aboriginal word Booyup, meaning "Place of Big Smoke", referring to the smoke from the burning of grasstrees, or "Place of Big Stones", in reference to the large granite rocks surrounding the Upper Blackwood area.

== Wards ==
The shire was divided into 4 wards, but this has since been altered to a single electorate through amendments to the Local Government Act (1995) removing wards for Tier3 and Tier 4 Councils. ( Boyup Brook is Tier 4 ).

== Towns and localities ==
The towns and localities of the Shire of Boyup Brook with population and size figures based on the most recent Australian census:

Locality	Population	Area	Map
Benjinup	143 (SAL 2021)	284.8 km^{2} (110.0 sq mi)	
Boyup Brook	938 (SAL 2021)	211.8 km^{2} (81.8 sq mi)	
Chowerup	32 (SAL 2021)	348.9 km^{2} (134.7 sq mi)	
Dinninup	161 (SAL 2021)	347.4 km^{2} (134.1 sq mi)	
Kulikup	143 (SAL 2021)	283.4 km^{2} (109.4 sq mi)	
Mayanup	174 (SAL 2021)	384.2 km^{2} (148.3 sq mi)	
McAlinden	70 (SAL 2021)	278 km^{2} (107 sq mi)	
Scotts Brook	89 (SAL 2021)	376.7 km^{2} (145.4 sq mi)	
Tonebridge	20 (SAL 2021)	247.3 km^{2} (95.5 sq mi)	
Wilga	71 (SAL 2021)	62.8 km^{2} (24.2 sq mi)	

== Heritage-listed places ==
As of 2023, 45 places are heritage-listed in the Shire of Boyup Brook, of which one is on the State Register of Heritage Places, the Norlup Homestead. The homestead, dating back to 1872, was added to the register on 24 March 1998.
