= Fremantle History Society =

Local history society in Fremantle, Western Australia

The Fremantle History Society is an historical society focused on Fremantle, Western Australia. Established in 1994, it grew from a community of heritage enthusiasts that had developed around the Fremantle Society established in 1972.

The two societies have worked towards establishing heritage protection in Fremantle, during different stages of threats to buildings and streetscape. Fremantle History Society has published the Fremantle Studies journal since 1999, as well as a newsletter, and every year hosts the Fremantle Studies Day conference at which authors of papers in the journal present their work.

== Selected publications ==
- Fremantle Studies. Fremantle History Society. ISSN 1443-0800. Wikidata Q117769957.
