= Shire of Kojonup =

Local government area in the Great Southern region of Western Australia

Coordinates: 33°50′17″S 117°09′07″E

- Local government area
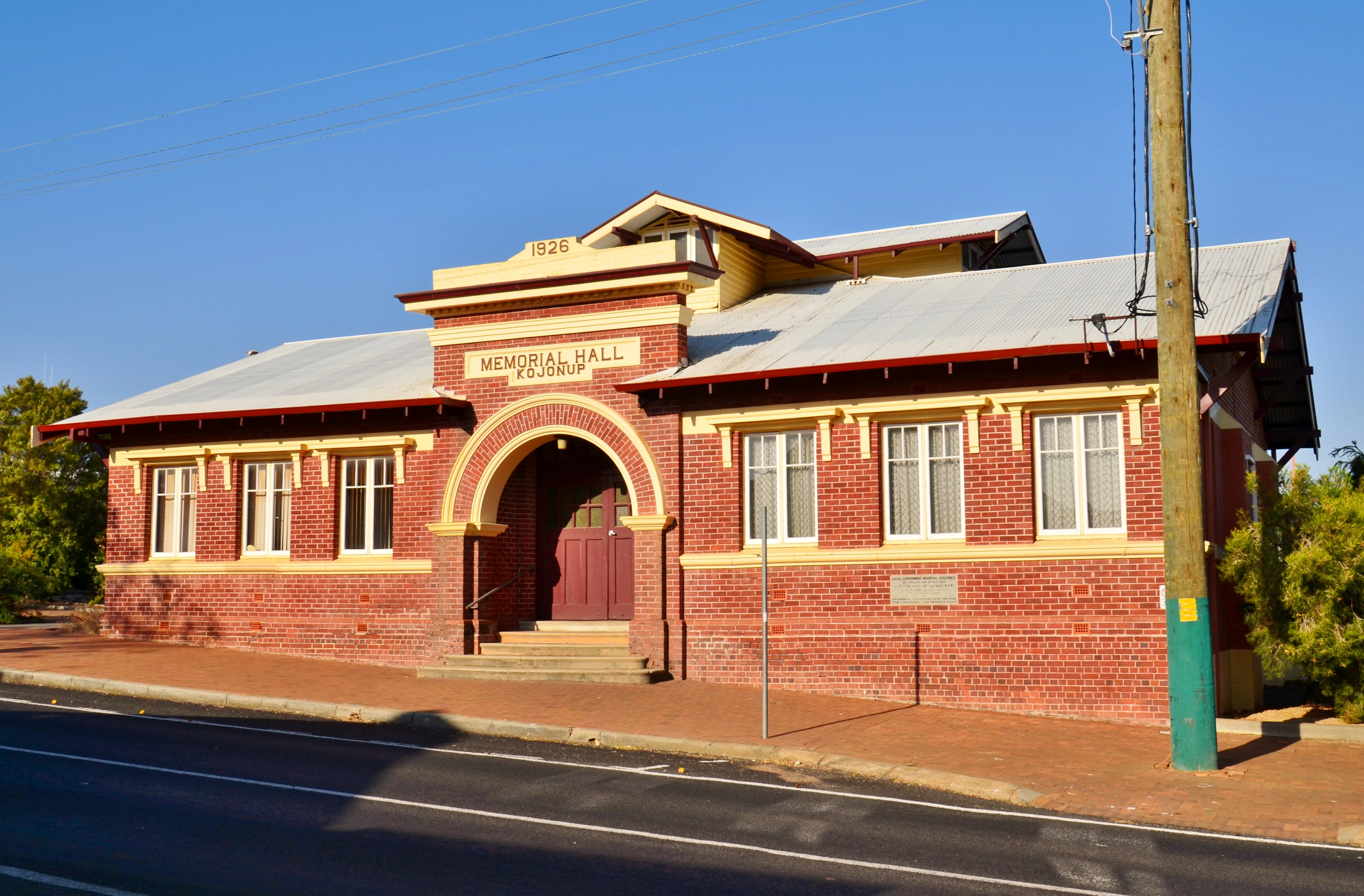
- Kojonup Memorial Hall, 2018

- Interactive map of Shire of Kojonup
- Country: Australia
- State: Western Australia
- Region: Great Southern
- Established: 1871
- Council seat: Kojonup

Government
  - Shire President: Roger Bilney
  - State electorate: Roe
  - Federal division: O'Connor

Area
  - Total: 2,932.2 km^{2} (1,132.1 sq mi)

Population
  - Total: 1,901 (LGA 2021)
- Website: Shire of Kojonup
LGAs around Shire of Kojonup
West Arthur	Woodanilling	Katanning
Boyup Brook	Shire of Kojonup	Broomehill-Tambellup
Manjimup	Cranbrook	Broomehill-Tambellup

The Shire of Kojonup is a local government area in the Great Southern region of Western Australia, about 250 kilometres (155 mi) southeast of the state capital, Perth, along Albany Highway. The Shire covers an area of 2,932 square kilometres (1,132 sq mi) and its seat of government is the town of Kojonup.

== History ==
The Kojonup Road District was created on 5 December 1871. On 1 July 1961, it became the Shire of Kojonup following the passage of the Local Government Act 1960, which reformed all remaining road districts into shires.

== Indigenous people ==
The Shire of Kojonup is located on the traditional land of the Kaniyang people of the Noongar nation.

== Wards ==
The shire has no wards, and all councillors serve 4-year terms. Previously, it was divided into 5 wards:

- Kojonup Ward (3 councillors)
- Balgarup Ward (2 councillors)
- Muradup Ward (2 councillors)
- Ongerup Ward (2 councillors)
- Namarillup Ward (2 councillors)

(Note: The town of Ongerup, unrelated to the ward, is located within the Shire of Gnowangerup.)

== Towns and localities ==
The towns and localities of the Shire of Kojonup with population and size figures based on the most recent Australian census:

Locality	Population	Area	Map
Boilup	32 (SAL 2021)	106.6 km^{2} (41.2 sq mi)	
Boscabel	71 (SAL 2021)	201.4 km^{2} (77.8 sq mi)	
Changerup	60 (SAL 2021)	203 km^{2} (78 sq mi)	
Cherry Tree Pool	72 (SAL 2021)	257.9 km^{2} (99.6 sq mi)	
Jingalup	139 (SAL 2021)	395.2 km^{2} (152.6 sq mi)	
Kojonup	1,157 (SAL 2021)	351.4 km^{2} (135.7 sq mi)	
Lumeah	86 (SAL 2021)	326.2 km^{2} (125.9 sq mi)	
Mobrup	40 (SAL 2021)	318.6 km^{2} (123.0 sq mi)	
Muradup	97 (SAL 2021)	172.7 km^{2} (66.7 sq mi)	
Orchid Valley	27 (SAL 2021)	224.7 km^{2} (86.8 sq mi)	
Qualeup	72 (SAL 2021)	205.4 km^{2} (79.3 sq mi)	
Ryansbrook	56 (SAL 2021)	167 km^{2} (64 sq mi)	

== Heritage-listed places ==
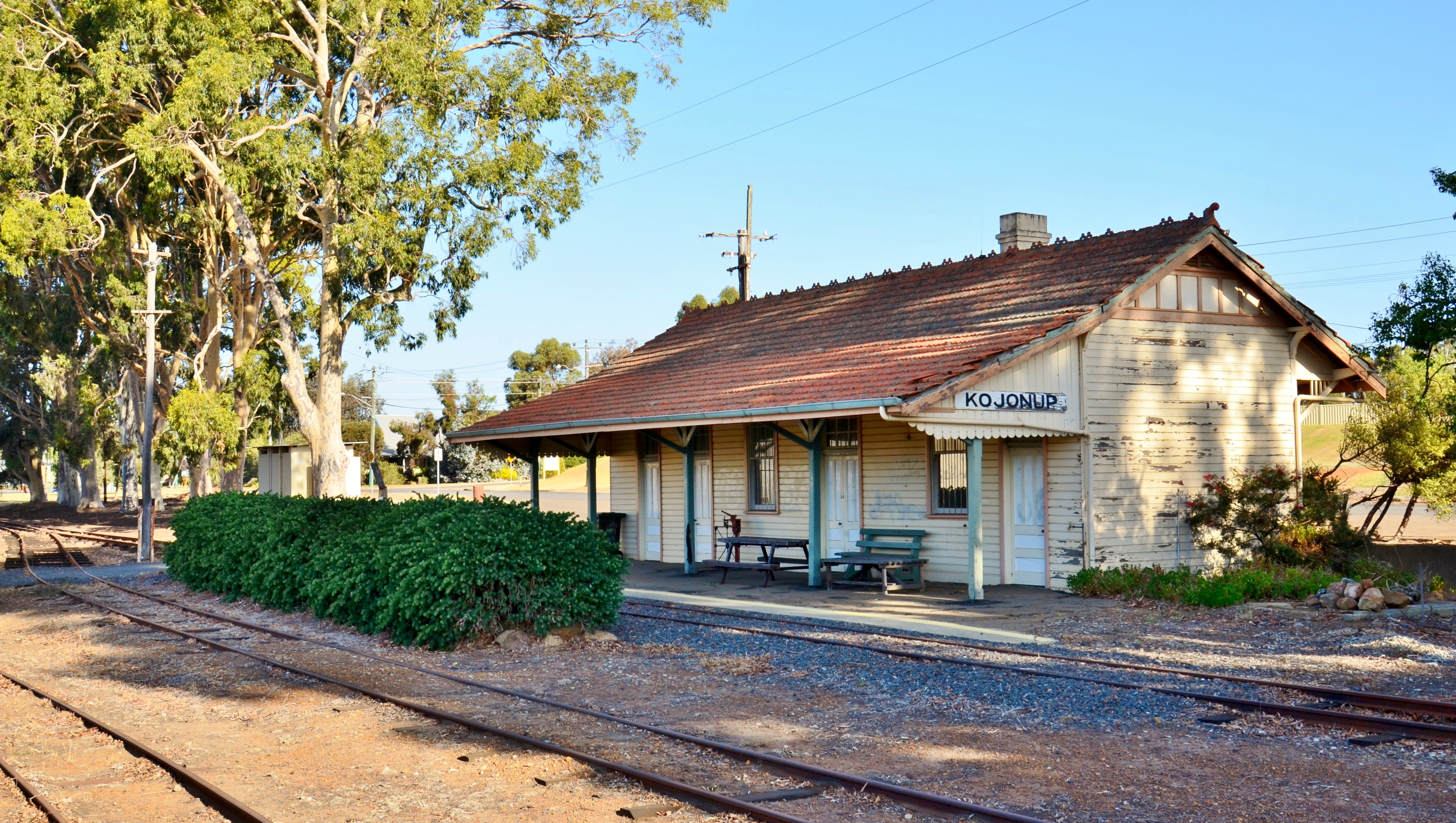
The state heritage listed former Kojonup Railway Station

As of 2023, 91 places are heritage-listed in the Shire of Kojonup, of which three are on the State Register of Heritage Places, one of three being the Carrolup Native Settlement.
