= Mayanup, Western Australia =

Mayanup
- Town
- Coordinates: 33.933°S 116.45°E
- Country: Australia
- State: Western Australia
- LGA(s): Shire of Boyup Brook
- Location: 283 km (176 mi) SSE of Perth; 17 km (11 mi) SSE of Boyup Brook
- Established: 1907

Government
  - State electorate(s): Warren-Blackwood
  - Federal division(s): O'Connor

Area
  - Total: 384.2 km^{2} (148.3 sq mi)
- Elevation: 206 m (676 ft)

Population
  - Total(s): 174 (SAL 2021)
- Postcode: 6244

Mayanup is a small town in the South West region of Western Australia. It is between Boyup Brook and Kojonup. At the 2006 census, Mayanup had a population of 323.

The area was opened for selection in the early 1900s and in 1904 the lands guide in the area asked the Lands Department to put space aside for a townsite at Scotts Brook. Land was set aside in 1905 even though the District Surveyor felt that there would insufficient demand. The area was initially known as Scott's Brook and also as Gnowergerup, the Aboriginal name of a nearby brook. Lots were surveyed in 1906 and the Upper Blackwood suggested the name of Mayanup. The town was gazetted in 1907.

Located in the town is the heritage-listed Mayanup Hall, a timber framed weatherboard and iron community hall built circa 1921.
