= Tone River (Western Australia) =

River in Western Australia

Coordinates: 34°24′03″S 116°25′25″E

Location
- Country: Australia

Physical characteristics
- Source
  - elevation: 269 metres (883 ft)
- Mouth
  - location: Warren River
  - elevation: 129 metres (423 ft)
- Length: 117 kilometres (73 mi)

The Tone River is a river in the South West region of Western Australia.

The headwaters of the river rise South West of Kojonup and flow in a south-westerly direction crossing Muir Highway through Strachan then discharging into the Warren River in Lake Muir Nature Reserve.

The Tone River and Upper Kent rivers were investigated in the 1980s in relation to salinity issues.

The river has four tributaries, Cockatoo Creek, Chowerup Creek, Murrain Brook and Mettabinup Creek.
