= Boyup Brook, Western Australia =

Boyup Brook
- Town
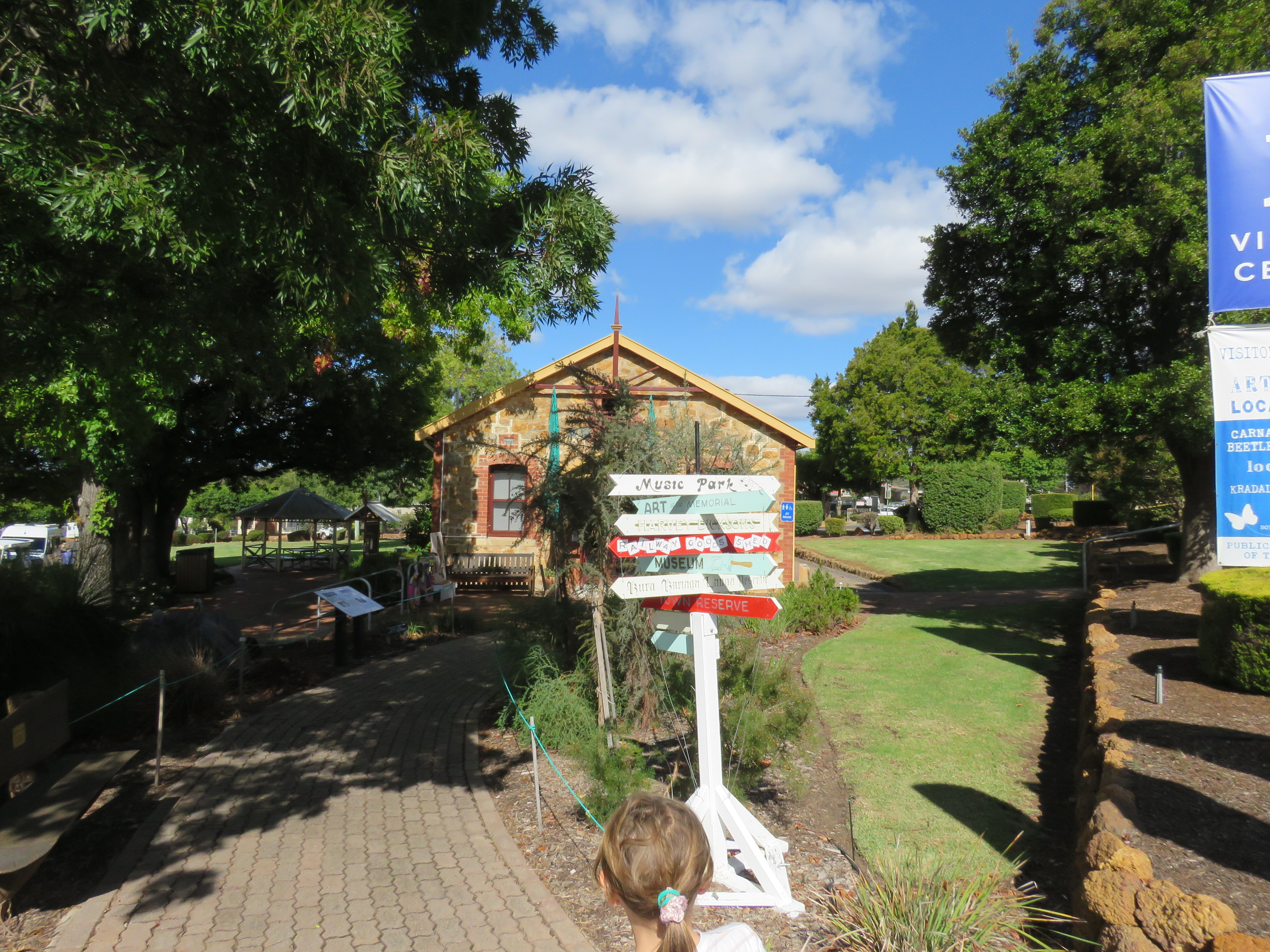
- The Boyup Brook Visitor Centre in April 2022

- Interactive map of Boyup Brook
- Coordinates: 33.834°S 116.388°E
- Country: Australia
- State: Western Australia
- LGA: Shire of Boyup Brook
- Location: 269 km (167 mi) south east of Perth; 126 km (78 mi) east of Bunbury; 31 km (19 mi) north east of Bridgetown
- Established: 1900

Government
  - State electorate: Warren-Blackwood
  - Federal division: O'Connor

Area
  - Total: 211.8 km^{2} (81.8 sq mi)
- Elevation: 194 m (636 ft)

Population
  - Total: 540 (UCL 2021)
- Postcode: 6244

Boyup Brook is a town in the south-west of Western Australia, 269 kilometres (167 mi) south-southeast of Perth and 31 kilometres (19 mi) northeast of Bridgetown. The town lies on Kaniyang land within the Noongar nation.

The name Boyup is derived from the name of a nearby pool called Booyup, an Aboriginal term meaning 'place of big stones' (that is, large granite outcrops common in the area) or 'place of big smoke' (from burning the many surrounding grass trees).

The town's economy is primarily agricultural. It is a CBH Group receival site.

== History ==
About 1839, John Hassell brought sheep and cattle from the eastern states of Australia via Albany, and acquired a lease of land along what would later become Scotts Brook, south of the current town site. Although he grazed this stock in the area, the leases did not become permanent, and Hassell later moved to Kendenup.

In 1845, Augustus Gregory followed the Blackwood River from the junction of the Arthur and Beaufort Rivers downstream for about 170 kilometres (110 mi). He carved his initials and the date into a jarrah tree, approximately 16 kilometres (10 mi) north-east of where the town now lies. That tree is now dead, but the stump and the markings remain. The stump – now known as Gregory Tree – has been covered for preservation.

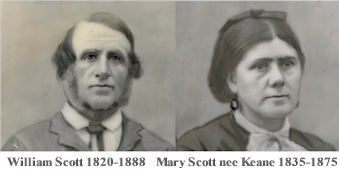
William and Mary Scott, lessees of first permanent settlement in Boyup Brook area

The first permanent settlement in the area was a 4,900-hectare (12,000-acre) lease, south of the current town site, along what became known as Scotts Brook. This lease was granted to William Scott and his wife Mary (née Keane). William arrived in Fremantle as a single passenger on Napoleon in 1841, and Mary on Travancore in 1853. They settled at Scotts Brook in 1854, having travelled from Albany following their wedding in the same year. Their marriage certificate shows William's occupation as bailiff for Peter Belches and his residence as Kindenup Farm, Albany.

Initially they named the property Rutherglen after Scott's family farm in Scotland. Scott later questioned the local Indigenous population about the original name of the area and was told it was Norlup, meaning 'shady place', due to the trees surrounding freshwater pools. Inspired by this Scott decided to rename the farm. In about 1872 Scott built a new house that remains to this day (albeit with more recent extensions and renovations), and is now listed as Norlup Homestead on the Heritage Council of Western Australia's register.

In 1861 James George Lee Steere, in partnership with Mr J H Monger, took up a 40,000-hectare (100,000-acre) lease near the Blackwood River. Shortly afterwards, his wife Catherine (Note: The history page on the shire's web site shows her name as Caroline, but all other references list her as Catherine.) and their baby son travelled from Bunbury to join him.

In 1871 William Forrest (Note: William was the brother of John Forrest.) moved into the area, to a farm called Dwalganup.

By 1882 there were nineteen families in the area. In 1896 land was set aside for a future town and the Upper Blackwood Road Board district (which became the Shire of Boyup Brook in 1961) was created as a separate local government area.

Boyup Brook was declared a town on 9 February 1900. The district had an area of 3,200 square kilometres (1,240 sq mi), and in December 1900 an estimated population of 400. Milestones in the town's early history include:

- 1900: Town's first building was opened, a school with 15 students.
- 1909: Railway line from Donnybrook reached Boyup Brook.
- 1910: Agricultural Hall was opened.
- 1911: Permanent policeman was assigned to the town, hotel was opened, and railway line was extended from Boyup Brook to Kojonup and Katanning.
- 1912: Official post office was established. (An unofficial post office had existed for three years prior to that.)
- 1914: Land in the town site was opened for leasing.
- 1924: Upper Blackwood Soldiers' Memorial Hospital was opened.
- c. 1930: Electricity was generated and distributed within the town site.
- 1936: Town hall was opened.

=== Name of the town ===
The town was originally gazetted as Boyup by an Executive Council minute dated 31 January 1900.

However the name Boyup Brook was in common use by the locals, the Progress Committee and the Upper Blackwood Road Board. In 1908 residents suggested that the town be renamed to Boyup Brook, to avoid confusion with the similarly named Boyanup. Lee Steere, by now the Speaker of the Assembly and member for Nelson, which included the area, strongly supported the use of the name over that of Throssell, which had been advocated by some at the time.

The name was ultimately changed to Boyup Brook on 5 February 1909 to match the railway station that was built in 1908–1909. Even after the change, there was still confusion about the name within the government, as can be seen in the name and text of the Boyup-Kojonup Railway Act 1909, assented some 10 months after the official change of name.

== Country music festival ==
The town hosts the Boyup Brook Country Music Festival, an annual event, held in February each year. The festival has been held since 1986 and the attendance at the event has increased from 500 at the first festival to over 13,000 in recent years. It was originally held on the town's football oval, but in 2007 the purpose-built Music Park, with a permanent 18-metre (59 ft) stage and sound shell, was officially opened and the festival has been held there each year since.

== Sport ==
Boyup Brook has many sporting teams within the community. In summer, cricket, tennis, swimming, basketball and lawn bowls are prominent, while in winter, Australian rules football, field hockey, netball and golf are played.

In cricket, Boyup Brook currently participates in the Warren Blackwood Association, having competed in the now disbanded Donnybrook Blackwood Cricket association. They have won five premierships, in 2001, 2006, 2008, 2012 and 2013.

The Boyup Roos football team participates in the Lower South West Football League. The Roos have won four premierships, in 1981, 2012, 2022 and 2024. The tennis and netball clubs run both juniors and seniors. The hockey club has its own junior club, as well as a ladies team that participates in the Bunbury competition. Golf is played during the winter weeks.

== Sources ==
- History of Boyup Brook. Boyup Brook Tourist Information Centre. 2025.
- Erickson, Rica (1979). Erickson, Frederica Lucy (ed.). Dictionary of Western Australians. Vol. 3, Free, 1850–1868. Nedlands: UWA Publishing. ISBN 0-85564-163-0. OCLC 757766995. Wikidata Q5273978.
- Erickson, Rica (1988a). Erickson, Frederica Lucy (ed.). Bicentennial Dictionary of Western Australians: Pre-1829 – 1888. Vol. II, D-J. Nedlands: UWA Publishing. ISBN 0-85564-273-4. LCCN 88151753. OCLC 19221630. OL 2102384M. Wikidata Q115122719.
- Erickson, Rica (1988b). Erickson, Frederica Lucy (ed.). Bicentennial Dictionary of Western Australians: Pre-1829 – 1888. Vol. III, K-Q. Nedlands: UWA Publishing. ISBN 0-85564-276-9. LCCN 88151753. OCLC 19221630. OL 2102384M. Wikidata Q115122719.
- Erickson, Rica (1988c). Erickson, Frederica Lucy (ed.). Bicentennial Dictionary of Western Australians: Pre-1829 – 1888. Vol. IV, R–Z. Nedlands: UWA Publishing. ISBN 0-85564-277-7. LCCN 88151753. OCLC 19221630. OL 2102384M. Wikidata Q115122719.
- Horton, David R. (1996). The AIATSIS Map of Indigenous Australia. Australian Institute of Aboriginal and Torres Strait Islander Studies. Wikidata Q134423353.
- Muir, Alison & Dinee (1982). Forrest Family, Pioneers of Western Australia, 1842–1982. J.R. Muir & Son. ISBN 0-9592883-0-9.
- Reece, Bob (2012). "Fremantle's first historian: Joseph Keane Hitchcock". Fremantle Studies. 7. Fremantle History Society: 33–50. ISSN 1443-0800.
- Schorer, Albert (1968). History of the Upper Blackwood. Bunbury, Western Australia: South West Printing and Publishing Co.
- "Boyup Brook – History". Shire of Boyup Brook. 2025.
- Statham, Pamela (1979). Erickson, Frederica Lucy (ed.). Dictionary of Western Australians. Vol. 1, Early Settlers, 1829–1850. Nedlands: UWA Publishing. ISBN 0-85564-159-2. OCLC 757766995. Wikidata Q5273978.
- "Boyup Brook". Sydney Morning Herald. 2006.
- "Shipping Intelligence". The Perth Gazette and Western Australian Journal. Vol. 9, no. 415. Western Australia. 16 January 1841. p. 2 – via National Library of Australia.
