= Kojonup, Western Australia =

Kojonup
- Town
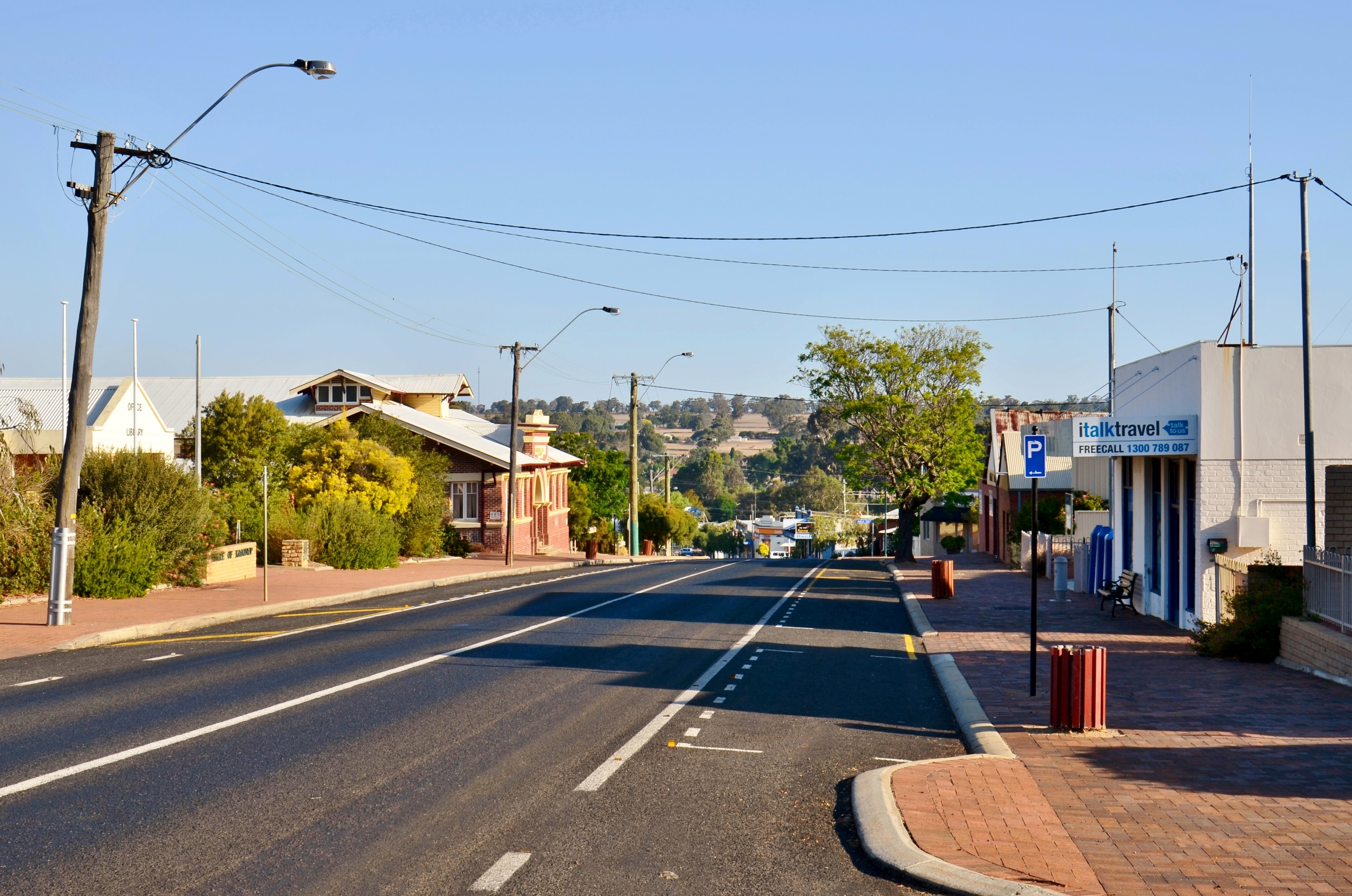
- Albany Highway, Kojonup, 2018

- Interactive map of Kojonup
- Coordinates: 33.84°S 117.15°E
- Country: Australia
- State: Western Australia
- LGA: Shire of Kojonup
- Location: 256 km (159 mi) S of Perth; 152 km (94 mi) N of Albany; 41 km (25 mi) WSW of Katanning
- Established: 1845

Government
  - State electorate: Roe
  - Federal division: O'Connor

Area
  - Total: 351.4 km^{2} (135.7 sq mi)
- Elevation: 305 m (1,001 ft)

Population
  - Total: 878 (UCL 2021)
- Postcode: 6395
- Mean max temp: 21.2 °C (70.2 °F)
- Mean min temp: 9.2 °C (48.6 °F)
- Annual rainfall: 531.3 mm (20.92 in)
Localities around Kojonup
Boilup	Boscabel	Cherry Tree Pool
Muradup	Kojonup	Broomehill West
Jingalup	Lumeah	Lumeah

Kojonup is a town 256 kilometres (159 mi) south-east of Perth, Western Australia along Albany Highway in the Great Southern region. The name Kojonup refers to the "Kodja" or stone axe made by Aboriginal Australians, from the local stone.

== History ==
The Noongar people lived in the area before European colonisation, as descendants of the Kaneang language group and their neighbours, such as the Koreng, Pinjareb, and Menang. Historically the Noongar people drank from the local freshwater spring and hunted game with the traditional Noongar "kodj" or "kodja", or stone axe. Both Kojonup and The Kodja Place are named after the historically significant implement.

The first European in the area was surveyor Alfred Hillman, who arrived in 1837 and had been guided to a freshwater spring by the Noongar people. The site was an important staging point on the road to Albany, and in 1837, a military post was established there to protect travellers and the mail. Between 1837 and 1845, Redcoat settlers inflicted violence on the Noongar people who lived in the area. By 1845, this outpost had grown to support a military barracks, built on the site of the freshwater spring. Today, the barracks still stand on their original site and house the Kojonup Historical Society Pioneer Museum. The barracks are one of the oldest buildings in Western Australia. The first farms in Kojonup were set up by soldiers with settlement grants. The appointment in 1865 of a mounted police constable marked the phasing out of the military presence at Kojonup. By the late 1860s, the military had left, and the barracks became a focus of community gatherings, much as they are today. The town's first police station was built in 1869, and the first hotel licence was granted in 1868.

In early 1898 the population of the town was 67, 32 men and 35 women.

The Katanning-Kojonup railway line, part of the Donnybrook–Katanning railway, was officially opened on 10 April 1907.

In 1926, the Kojonup Memorial Hall was built for £5,000; it was officially opened by Major General Sir Talbot Hobbs.

Kojonup has been the home to many important Australian rules football players, including several players of Indigenous Australian descent.

== Economy ==
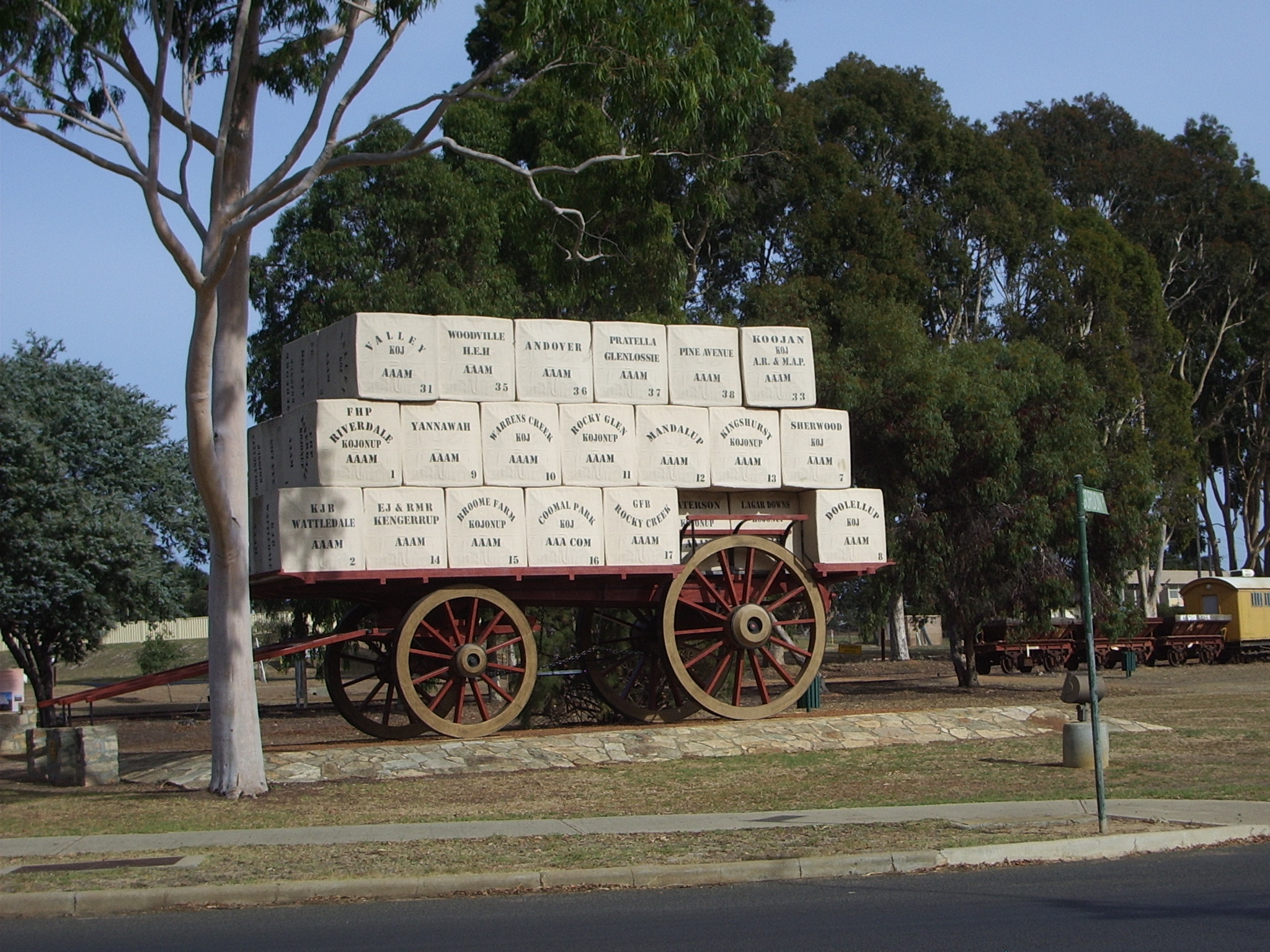
Giant Dray in Kojonup

The early economy of the town was initially dependent on cutting and transporting sandalwood and kangaroo hunting. Still, by the mid-19th century, the wool industry began to boom, and by 1906, the shire had 10,500 sheep. By 1989, the shire had seen over 1 million sheep being shorn.

To celebrate the importance of the wool industry, the town built a one-and-a-half-scale model of a wool wagon; the project was officially opened on Australia Day in 2001.

The surrounding areas produce wheat and other cereal crops, including organic, conventional, and genetically modified.

The Kojonup region has hosted some of Australia's earliest biodynamic and organic agriculture endeavours. The Marsh v Baxter case has put Kojonup at the epicentre of the battle in Australia of organic versus genetically modified agriculture. The town is a receival site for Cooperative Bulk Handling.

== Recreation ==
Sporting facilities include a golf club with 18 holes, a tennis club, a skate park, a 50-metre (160 ft) outdoor swimming pool, a football oval, netball courts, and hockey ovals. Other attractions are The Kodja Place, Kojonup Youth Centre and rose maze. Town elder, Billy Riley, gives tours at The Kodja Place, recognising the Noongar history of Kojonup. The name of the Jack Cox courtyard commemorates the life of the first Noongar guide at Kodja Place.

== Notable people ==
- Peter Bell, Australian rules football player, member of the Australian Football Hall of Fame.
- Stephen Michael, Australian rules football player, member of the Australian Football Hall of Fame.
- Shannon Cox, Australian rules football player, former Collingwood Football Club player.
- Robert Moir, medical scientist.
- Kevin O'Halloran, Olympic swimmer
- Brigadier Arnold William Potts (DSO, OBE, MC, MID), Australian grazier who served in both World Wars.
- Old Mervs, Australian indie rock band consisting of David House and Henry Carrington-Jones. The duo have known each other since five years of age and grew up together in Kojonup.

== Climate ==
Climate data for Kojonup
Month	Jan	Feb	Mar	Apr	May	Jun	Jul	Aug	Sep	Oct	Nov	Dec	Year
Record high °C (°F)	44.2 (111.6)	43.2 (109.8)	38.6 (101.5)	36.1 (97.0)	32.2 (90.0)	22.8 (73.0)	21.5 (70.7)	24.6 (76.3)	27.4 (81.3)	33.2 (91.8)	38.8 (101.8)	40.1 (104.2)	44.2 (111.6)
Mean daily maximum °C (°F)	29.5 (85.1)	28.8 (83.8)	26.1 (79.0)	22.2 (72.0)	18.1 (64.6)	15.1 (59.2)	14.4 (57.9)	14.9 (58.8)	16.8 (62.2)	20.1 (68.2)	23.5 (74.3)	27.7 (81.9)	21.4 (70.5)
Mean daily minimum °C (°F)	13.1 (55.6)	13.7 (56.7)	12.6 (54.7)	10.6 (51.1)	8.1 (46.6)	6.7 (44.1)	5.9 (42.6)	5.8 (42.4)	6.2 (43.2)	6.2 (43.2)	9.7 (49.5)	11.8 (53.2)	9.3 (48.7)
Record low °C (°F)	4.0 (39.2)	3.9 (39.0)	2.4 (36.3)	2.2 (36.0)	−3.5 (25.7)	−2.5 (27.5)	−2.6 (27.3)	−1.4 (29.5)	−1.0 (30.2)	−0.2 (31.6)	0.0 (32.0)	2.8 (37.0)	−3.5 (25.7)
Average precipitation mm (inches)	13.9 (0.55)	13.9 (0.55)	22.0 (0.87)	32.3 (1.27)	66.6 (2.62)	87.1 (3.43)	86.5 (3.41)	74.0 (2.91)	52.7 (2.07)	39.8 (1.57)	24.1 (0.95)	15.2 (0.60)	527.3 (20.76)
Average precipitation days	3.4	3.2	4.6	7.7	13.4	16.7	18.1	17.0	14.2	11.0	6.8	4.0	120.1
Average afternoon relative humidity (%)	37	41	42	50	62	72	72	70	63	57	48	41	55

== See also ==
- Kojonup Reserve
