= Kaniyang =

Indigenous people of Western Australia

The Kaneang are an indigenous Noongar people of the south west region of Western Australia.

== Country ==
The Kaneang traditional lands enclosed some 4,800 square miles (12,000 km^{2}) of territory. On the Upper Blackwood River. The eastern boundary was formed by the line that runs from Katanning, Tambellup, Cranbrook, and Tenterden. Kaneang lands took in Kojonup, Qualeup, Donnybrook, Greenbushes and Bridgetown. They camped around the headwaters of both the Warren and Frankland rivers and along the southern bank of the Collie River as far as Collie.

== Alternative names ==
- Kunjung/Kunyung (Koreng exonym)
- Kadbaranggara (Wiilman exonym from ka:la, "fire")
- Jabururu (Menang word meaning "northerners")
- Yobberore
- Uduc-Harvey tribe
- Kaleap (toponym)
- Qualeup, Qualup, Quailup
- Waal

== Some words ==
- mammon (farther)
- nongan (mother)
- yungar (kangaroo)
- weja (emu)
- dwoda (tame dog)
- yakkine (wild dog)
- iunja (white man)
- gootang-boola' (children)
- quabba (good)
- wakine (bad)

== Sources ==
- "AIATSIS map of Indigenous Australia". AIATSIS.
- "Tindale Tribal Boundaries" (PDF). Department of Aboriginal Affairs, Western Australia. September 2016. Archived from the original (PDF) on 8 March 2016.
- Clark, William Nairne (16 February 1842). "An inquiry respecting the aborigines of south-western Australia". Perth. Australia: Inquirer. pp. 4–5 – via Trove.
- Clark, William Nairne (23 February 1842). "An inquiry respecting the aborigines of south-western Australia 2". Perth. Australia: Inquirer. pp. 4–5 – via Trove.
- Clark, William Nairne (2 March 1842). "An inquiry respecting the aborigines of south-western Australia 3". Perth, Australia: Inquirer. p. 4 – via Trove.
- Nind, Scott (1831). "Description of the Natives of King George's Sound (Swan River Colony) and Adjoining Country". Journal of the Royal Geographical Society of London. 1: 21–51. doi:10.2307/1797657. JSTOR 1797657.
- Small, M. B. (1886). "Uduc, Harvey" (PDF). In Curr, Edward Micklethwaite (ed.). The Australian race: its origin, languages, customs, place of landing in Australia and the routes by which it spread itself over the continent. Vol. 1. Melbourne: J. Ferres.
- Tindale, Norman Barnett (1974). "Kaneang (WA)". Aboriginal Tribes of Australia: Their Terrain, Environmental Controls, Distribution, Limits, and Proper Names. Australian National University. Archived from the original on 20 March 2020.
