= List of State Register of Heritage Places in the Shire of West Arthur =

List of heritage sites in Western Australia

The State Register of Heritage Places is maintained by the Heritage Council of Western Australia. As of 2026, 60 places are heritage-listed in the Shire of West Arthur, of which three are on the State Register of Heritage Places.

== List ==
=== State Register of Heritage Places ===
The Western Australian State Register of Heritage Places, as of 2026, lists the following three state registered places within the Shire of West Arthur:

Place name	Place #	Street number	Street name	Suburb or town	Co-ordinates	Notes & former names	Photo
"The Arthur" Wool Shed Group	8804	Corner	Wagin Road & Albany Highway	Arthur River	33.347393°S 117.038416°E	Old Tillellan, Piesses Shearing Shed & Piesses Shearing Quarters	
Old Tillellan (Piesse's) Shearing Shed	23458	Corner	Wagin Road & Albany Highway	Arthur River	33.346768°S 117.03811°E	Part of "The Arthur" Wool Shed Group (8804)	
Old Tillellan (Piesse's) Shearing Quarters	23459	Corner	Wagin Road & Albany Highway	Arthur River	33.346486°S 117.038819°E	Part of "The Arthur" Wool Shed Group (8804)	

=== Shire of West Arthur heritage-listed places ===
The following places are heritage listed in the Shire of West Arthur but are not State registered:

Place name	Place #	Street number	Street name	Suburb or town	Notes & former names	Photo
Woagin Homestead	2694	17961	Albany Highway	Arthur River	Woagin Farm Outbuildings	
St Paul's Anglican Church, Graveyard & Sandalwood Trees	2698	21	Albany Highway	Arthur River		
Wayside Inn (former)	2699		Albany Highway	Arthur River	Residence	
Darkan Road Board Office (former)	2700	29	Burrowes Street	Darkan	West Arthur Roads Board, Agricultural Protection Board	
Darkan Hotel	2702	4	Coalfields Highway	Darkan		
Darkan Railway Station Precinct	2703		Coalfields Road	Darkan	part of the former Brunswick Junction to Narrogin railway line	
Original School Building	2704		Glenorchy Road	Moodiarrup	Glenorchy School	
Hall	2706		Dinninup Road	Moodiarrup	Moodiarrup Hall	
Darkan Pioneer Hall	3327	32	Hillman Street	Darkan		
Arthur River Precinct	4269		Albany Highway	Arthur River	Mount Pleasant Inn, 125 Mile Settlement	
Bottlebrush Tree	4396			Darkan		
Old National Bank	8786	5	Coalfields Highway	Darkan		
Darkan Saw Mill/Mill Houses	8787	Lot 1	Coalfields Road	Darkan		
Duranillin Store	8788		Farrell Street	Duranillin		
Darkan School	8789		Burrowes Street	Darkan		
Duranillin School	8790		Horley Street	Duranillin		
Mrs Maude King's House	8791	46	Hillman Street	Darkan		
Nangip Homestead	8792		Darkan South Road	Darkan		
Sunnyhurst Homestead	8793		Coalfields Highway	Darkan		
Six Mile Cottage	8795		Darkan-Quindanning Road	Darkan		
Tachbrook Homestead	8796		Coalfields Road	Mt Brown		
Madden Homestead	8797		Albany Highway	East Arthur		
Madden's Cottage	8798		Albany Highway	Arthur River		
Hillman Airfield	8799		Hillman-Dardadine Road	Hillman		
Hillman Dam	8808			Hillman		
Boolading Homestead Ruins	8809		Coalfields Road	Boolading		
Darlingup Homestead	8810		Darlingup	Moodiarrup		
Traverse Point and Ford, Capercup	8811		Dinninup Road	Moodiarrup		
Marsh's Chimneys, Capercup	8812		Dinninup Road	Moodiarrup		
Putland Motors	8813	35	Burrowes Street	Darkan		
Arthur River Road Bridge	13109		Hughes Mill Road	Arthur River	MRWA 4017	
Darkan Uniting Church	15260		Hillman Street	Darkan		
Kylie Water Tower	15262		Kylie East Arthur Road	Kylie		
Hillman River Railway Bridge	15706		Brunswick Junction-Narrogin Railway	West Arthur	part of the former Brunswick Junction to Narrogin railway line	
Kylie Dam Reserve & Water Tank	18795		Bokal East Arthur Road	Kylie		
Aboriginal Reserve and Nissen Hut	18807		Coalfields Highway	Coalfields Highway		
Darkan Cemetery	18808	Lot 147	Darkan South Road	Darkan		
Tabelup Homestead	18809		Albany Highway	Arthur River		
Towerrining Homestead	18810	Lot 3110	Darkan South Road	Moodiarrup		
Lake Towerrinning	18811		Durannillin South Road	Moodiarrup		
Duranillin Railway Bridge	18812			Duranillin	part of the former Wagin to Bowelling railway line	
Duranillin Garage	18813		Farrell Street	Duranillin		
Bowelling Railway Station	18814		Coalfields Highway	Bowelling	part of the former Brunswick Junction to Narrogin and Wagin to Bowelling railway line	
Bowelling Dam	18815			Bowelling		
Haddleton Homestead	18818		Trigwell Bridge Road	Trigwell		
Haddleton Shearing Shed	18819		Trigwell Bridge Road	Trigwell		
Haddleton School	18820		Trigwell Bridge Road	Darkan		
Sarah Ann Gibbs Tree	18827			Darkan		
Sandalwood Tree (St Pauls)	23804		Albany Highway	Arthur River		
St Pauls Graveyard	23808	Location 21	Albany Highway	Arthur River		
Arthur River Post Office	23812		Albany Highway	Arthur River		
St Paul's Church (Anglican)	23851		Albany Highway	Arthur River		
Railway Crane and Loading Ramp	23874		Coalfields Road	Darkan	part of the former Brunswick Junction to Narrogin railway line	
Arthur River Hall	23876		Albany Highway	Arthur River		
Mount Pleasant Inn Kitchen	23904	Corner	Wagin Road and Albany Highway	Arthur River Township		
Darkan Station Master's House	23917		Coalfields Road	Darkan		
Darkan Railway Station	24447		Coalfields Road	Darkan	part of the former Brunswick Junction to Narrogin railway line	
