= Newdegate railway line =

Railway line in Western Australia

Wagin to Newdegate railway line
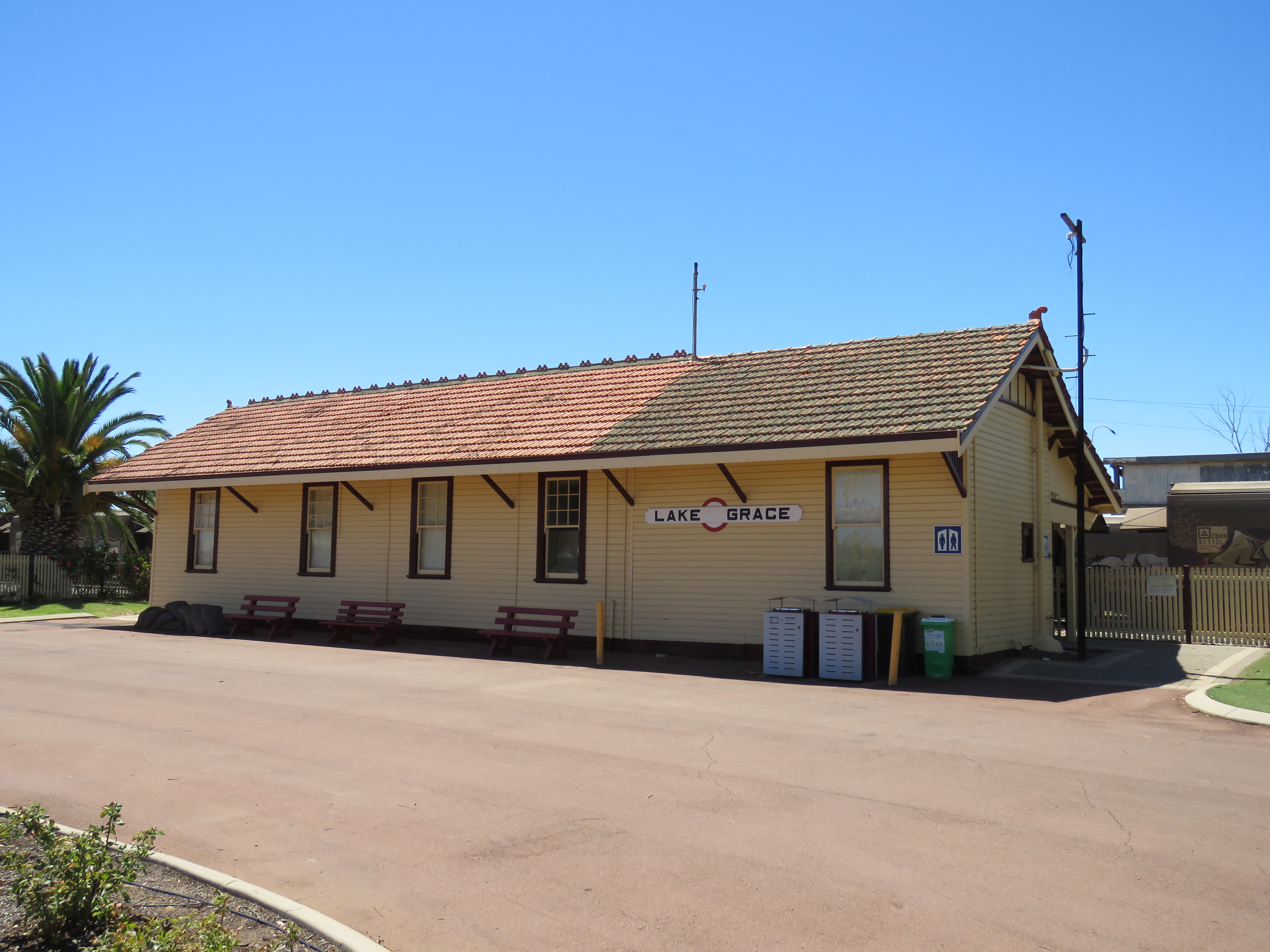
- Lake Grace Railway Station in January 2024

Overview
- Status: Open
- Owner: Arc Infrastructure (leased from the Public Transport Authority)
- Locale: Wheatbelt, Western Australia
- Termini: Wagin; Newdegate Hyden (branch line)

Service
- Operator: Aurizon under contract to CBH Group

History
- Work began: 1906
- Opened: 15 February 1926

Technical
- Line length: 182 km (113 mi)
- Track gauge: 1,067 mm (3 ft 6 in)
- Signalling: Train Order Working
- Highest elevation: 387.4 m (1,271 ft)
- Wagin to Newdegate railway line Main locations

The Wagin to Newdegate railway line is a railway line in the Wheatbelt region of Western Australia, connecting Wagin via Lake Grace to Newdegate, where the line terminates. The line is 180 kilometres (110 mi) long. At Lake Grace, a 94-kilometre (58 mi) branch line to Hyden exists, while, at Wagin, the railway line connects to the Great Southern Railway and the Wagin to Bowelling railway line. Formerly, at Wagin, it also connected to the now inactive railway line to Bowelling.

== History ==
The Great Southern Railway, passing through Wagin, was established in 1889, having been constructed in a three-year period from 1886.

The Wagin–Dumbleyung Railway Act 1905, an act by the Parliament of Western Australia granted assent on 23 December 1905, authorised the construction of the railway line from Wagin to Dumbleyung. A second act, the Wagin–Dumbleyung Railway Extension Act 1911, was assented to 16 February 1911, authorising the construction of the extension to Kukerin. The third act, the Wagin–Kukerin Railway Extension Act 1914, was assented to on 12 January 1915, approving the construction of the line from Kukerin to Lake Grace.

The Wagin to Newdegate railway line's contract for construction for the first section from Wagin to Dumbleyung, 41 kilometres (25 mi), was awarded on 3 June 1906. It was constructed by the Western Australian Public Works Department (PWD) and opened on 19 February 1907. The second section, from Dumbeleyung to Kukerin, 38 kilometres (24 mi), was awarded on 17 May 1911 and opened on 3 May 1912, again constructed by the PWD. The third section of the line, Kukerin to Lake Grace, 40 kilometres (25 mi), was awarded to the PWD on 19 July 1915 and opened 18 June 1916. The official opening took place in the presence of the Premier of Western Australia, John Scaddan, and the Minister for Works, William Angwin.

The Lake Grace–Newdegate Railway Act 1923 was assented to on 22 December 1923, approving the construction of the line from Lake Grace to Newdegate. The final 63-kilometre (39 mi) section of the railway line from Lake Grace to Newdegate was awarded to the PWD on 16 January 1925 and opened on 15 February 1926.

In between, in the other direction, westbound, a railway line from Wagin to Bokal was completed in 1917 and extended to Bowelling in late 1918, where it connected to the Brunswick Junction to Narrogin railway line, which had been completed in 1907.

The Lake Grace–Karlgarin Railway Act 1928 was assented to on 27 December 1928, approving the construction of the line from Lake Grace to Karlgarin. On 2 June 1930, the contract for the branch line from Lake Grace to Hyden was awarded to the Public Works Department. The line, 94 kilometres (58 mi) long, was opened on 5 April 1933.

In 1954, the state government of Western Australia had compiled a list of loss-making railway operations, of which the Lake Grace to Newdegate and the Lake Grace to Hyden lines were part, having had a total expenditure of almost four times their earnings in the financial year to June 1953. The Newdegate line had an expenditure of £31,471 versus earnings of £6,996; the Hyden line figures were even less favourable at £35,686 versus £6,347.

In December 2000, Westrail's freight operations and a 49-year lease of Westrail's freight network, including the Wagin to Newdegate railway line, was sold to Australian Railroad Group (ARG), a joint venture between Wesfarmers and Genesee & Wyoming. ARG set up a subsidiary, WestNet Rail, to manage the below-rail operations. In February 2006, it was announced that ARG would sell WestNet Rail to Babcock & Brown, and the above-rail operations would be sold to Queensland Rail. Babcock & Brown Infrastructure was renamed Prime Infrastructure in October 2009, and in 2010, the company merged with Brookfield Infrastructure Partners. In August 2011, WestNet Rail was rebranded Brookfield Rail, and in July 2017, Brookfield Rail was rebranded as Arc Infrastructure.

In 2010, CBH Group, the grain growers' co-operative, signed a 10-year contract with Watco Australia to operate CBH trains. The contract commenced at the start of May 2012, upon the ending of CBH's contract with ARG. The contract with Watco ended six months early, with a new six-year contract between CBH and Aurizon commencing in late 2021.

Arc Infrastructure deems the railway line to be part of its Grain Freight Rail Network, which, in 2017, accounted for 50 percent of its network but only 10 percent of its freight. The entire line to Hyden and Newdegate was classified as Tier 1.

== Elevation ==
The railway line starts at an elevation of 254.3 metres (834 ft) at Wagin and finishes at Newdegate at an elevation of 300.7 metres (987 ft). It reaches its lowest point of 250.5 metres (822 ft) at the 5.6-kilometre (3.5 mi) mark, just east of Wagin, and its highest point of 387.4 metres (1,271 ft) at the 90.2-kilometre (56.0 mi) mark, west of Tarin Rock.

The Lake Grace to Hyden branch starts at an elevation of 287.4 metres (943 ft) and finishes at an elevation of 387.8 metres (1,272 ft) at Hyden, its highest point. It reaches its lowest point of 272.7 metres (895 ft) at the 31.2-kilometre (19.4 mi) mark, south of Pingaring.

== Heritage ==
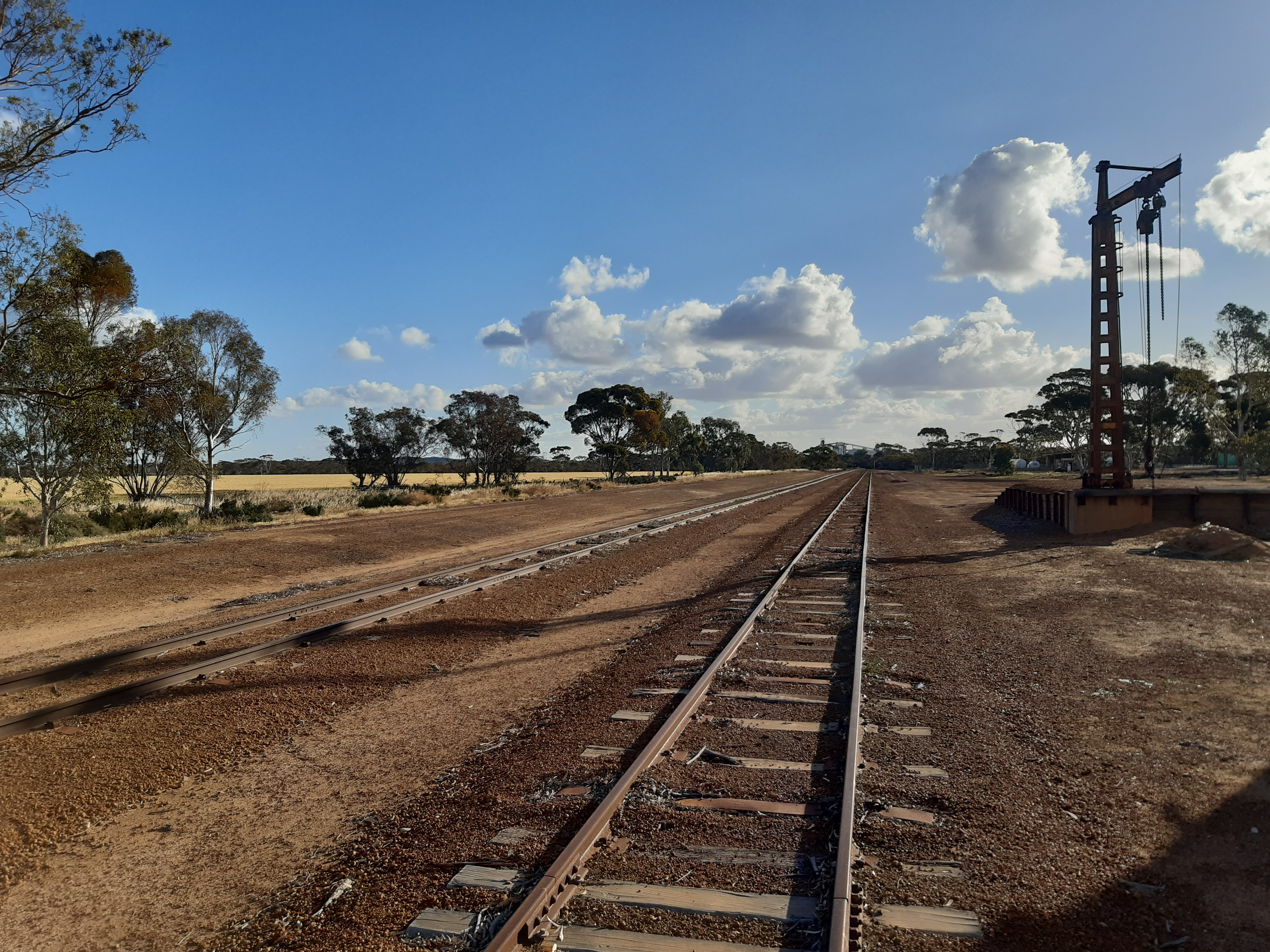
A railway crane at the end of the line at Hyden

The heritage listed Wagin Railway Station was completed on 25 April 1911, replacing an early building that was relocated in 1906.

Further east along the railway line, the Dumbleyung Railway Station precinct is on the Shire of Dumbleyung heritage list. The Dumbleyung station was opened in 1913, six years after the railway line to Dumbleyung opened and was operated for 71 years, until 1984, when the station master was withdrawn.

In the Shire of Lake Grace, the Lake Grace Railway precinct, consisting of the station, station masters house and goods shed, and the Newdegate Railway precinct are on the shire's heritage list.

On the Hyden branch line, the Pingaring Railway siding precinct is on the Shire of Kulin's heritage list. In the neighbouring Shire of Kondinin, the Hyden Railway siding precinct is on the shire's heritage list. Passenger services to Hyden ceased in the early 1950s and the line was briefly closed in 1957 but reopened in 1960.
