= Duranillin, Western Australia =

Town in Western Australia

Duranillin
- Town
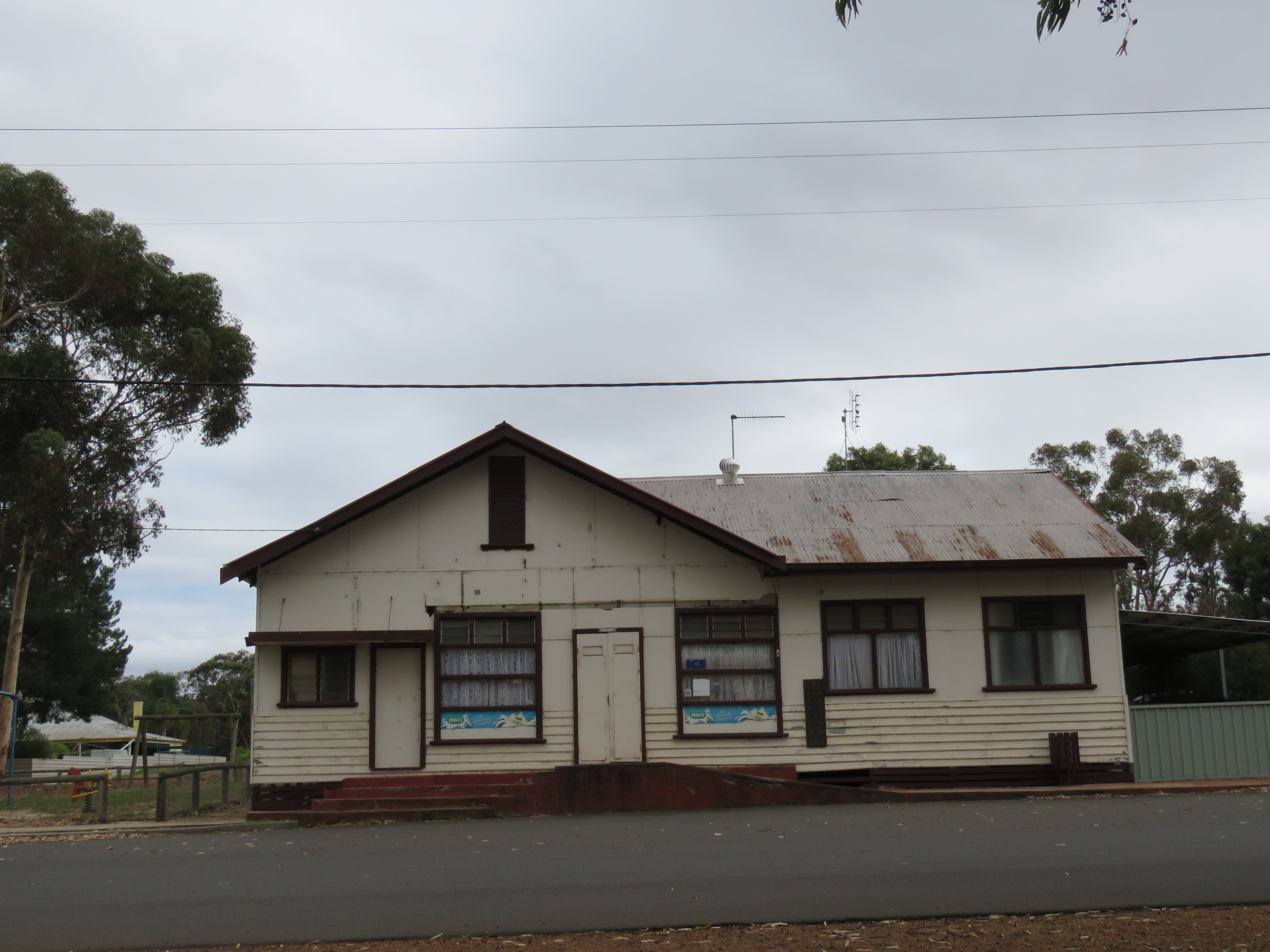
- The heritage listed former Duranillin Store

- Coordinates: 33.51°S 116.80°E
- Country: Australia
- State: Western Australia
- LGA(s): Shire of West Arthur
- Location: 223 km (139 mi) from Perth; 84 km (52 mi) from Wagin; 84 km (52 mi) from Collie
- Established: 1916

Government
  - State electorate(s): Roe
  - Federal division(s): O'Connor

Area
  - Total: 172.7 km^{2} (66.7 sq mi)

Population
  - Total(s): 53 (SAL 2021)
- Postcode: 6393

Duranillin is a small town located in the Wheatbelt region of Western Australia, 24 kilometres (15 mi) south of Darkan near the junction of the Arthur and Beaufort rivers.

== History ==
The town's name is of Aboriginal origin and was first recorded by a surveyor in 1877, as with Moodiarrup further south, but the meaning of the name is not known. The town was established in 1916 when the Wagin to Bowelling railway line was built, and gazetted in 1918. The Duranillin railway bridge over the Arthur River was constructed for this railway line and is now on the shire's heritage list.

The first building was a store built by Lewis Hibble, and was followed in the 1920s by a few settlers. Until 1968, the railway was the main employer in the town. A major timber mill, operated by the Hughes family, employed three or four families.

== Present day ==
Duranillin today is a small town with a post office and store. It serves as a trading post and meeting place for the farming families and agricultural community in the broader area, and periodically stages local events which attract visitors.

Lake Towerrinning, located south of the town, is the main attraction of the area. It is a semi-freshwater lake covering 256 hectares (633 acres), and a popular swimming spot with picnic areas and clean sandy beaches, offering water skiing and swimming as well as serving as a sanctuary for aquatic bird life.
