= Coalfields Highway =

Highway in Western Australia

Coalfields Road Western Australia
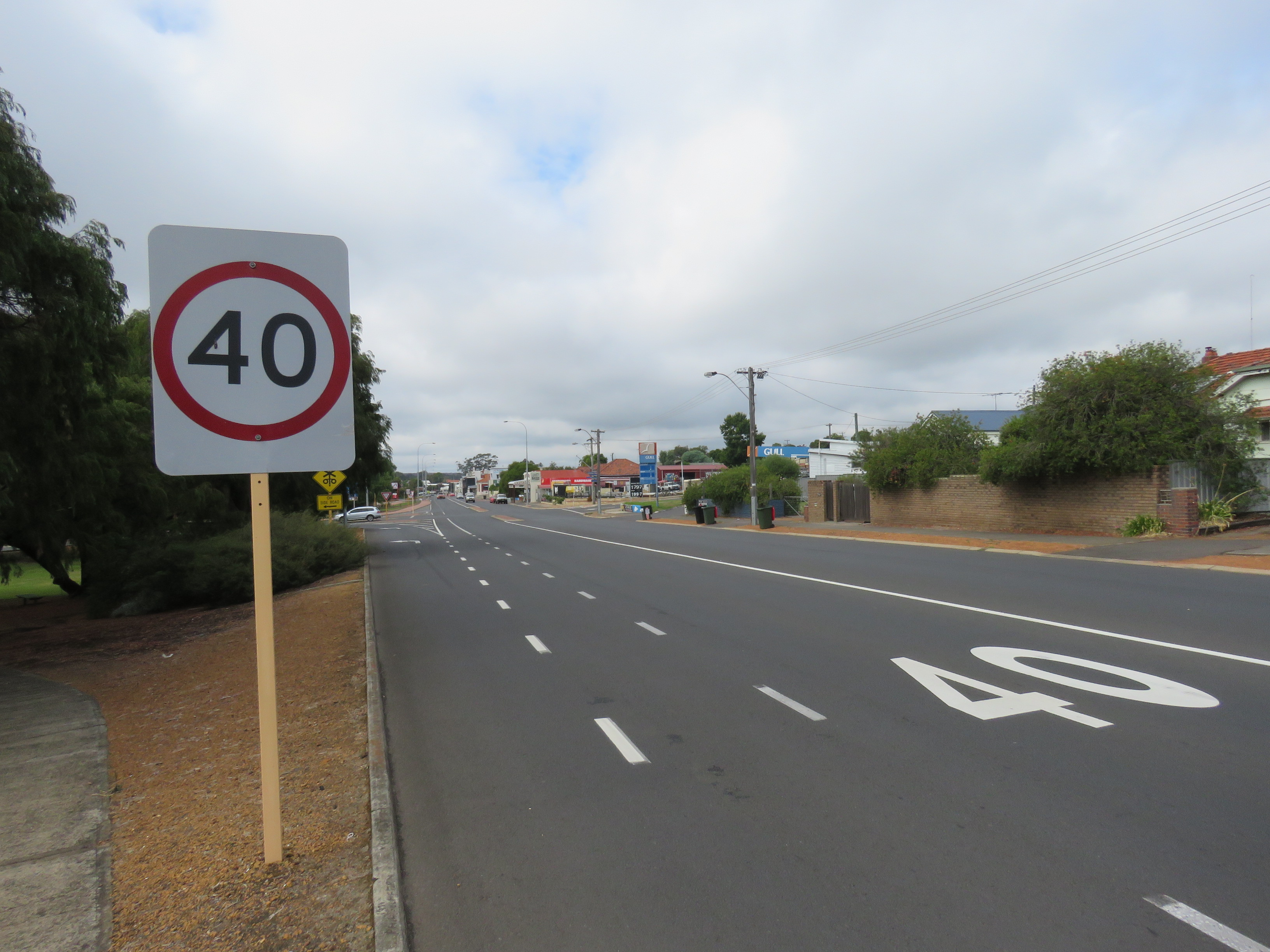
- The Coalfields Highway in Collie

General information
- Type: Highway
- Length: 128 km (80 mi)
- Route number(s): State Route 107

Major junctions
- West end: South Western Highway (State Route 20), Roelands
- East end: Albany Highway (State Route 30), Arthur River

Location(s)
- Major settlements: Allanson, Collie, Darkan

Highway system
- Highways in Australia; National Highway • Freeways in Australia; Highways in Western Australia

Coalfields Road is a Western Australian highway linking Roelands (near Bunbury) on the South Western Highway with Arthur River on the Albany Highway. It is signed as State Route 107 and is about 125 kilometres (78 mi) long.

== Route description ==
Coalfields Road is the main road to the key mining town of Collie, and passes through mining, forest and agricultural areas with stands of jarrah, wandoo and flood gum nearby. It also traverses the towns of Allanson and Darkan. The section between Collie and Allanson was upgraded in 2010–2011 by increasing the lane and shoulder widths, realigning some of the worst of the winding road sections, lessening some curves, and other improvements.

Route 107 continues beyond Arthur River to Wagin, Dumbleyung, Lake Grace, Newdegate and Lake King, meeting up with South Coast Highway (Route 1) a few kilometres from Ravensthorpe.

== Major intersections ==
LGA	Location	km	mi	Destinations	Notes
Harvey	Roelands	0	0.0	South Western Highway (State Route 20) – Bunbury, Perth	
Collie	Collie	35.3	21.9	Prinsep Street	Access to Collie Town Centre
Collie	Collie	35.9	22.3	Collie–Mumballup Road – Mumballup, Donnybrook, Boyup Brook	
Collie	Collie	37.2	23.1	Paull Street – Williams	Paull Street becomes Collie–Williams Road partway through
West Arthur	Darkan	98	61	Williams–Darkan Road – Williams	
West Arthur	Arthur River	128	80	Albany Highway (State Route 30) – Wagin, Kojonup, Albany, Williams	
1.000 mi = 1.609 km; 1.000 km = 0.621 mi

== See also ==
- Highways in Australia
- List of highways in Western Australia
