= Wagin to Bowelling railway line =

Former railway line in Western Australia

Overview
- Status: Closed
- Owner: Government of Western Australia
- Locale: Wheatbelt, Western Australia
- Termini: Wagin; Bowelling

Service
- Operator(s): Western Australian Government Railways

History
- Commenced: 1914
- Opened: 10 December 1918
- Closed: 1 June 1986

Technical
- Line length: 102 km (63 mi)
- Track gauge: 1,067 mm (3 ft 6 in)
- Wagin to Bowelling railway line Main locations

The Wagin to Bowelling railway line was a state government-owned and WAGR-operated railway line in the Wheatbelt region of Western Australia, connecting Wagin via Bokal to Bowelling. The line was 102 kilometres (63 mi) long. At Wagin, the railway line connected to the Great Southern Railway and the Wagin to Newdegate railway line while, at Bowelling, it connected to the Brunswick Junction to Narrogin railway line.

== History ==
The Great Southern Railway, passing through Wagin, was established in 1889, having been constructed in a three-year period from 1886. At the Bowelling end of the future line, the railway had arrived in 1907 with the completion of the Collie to Darkan section of the Brunswick Junction to Narrogin railway line.

The Wagin–Bowelling Railway Act 1912, an act by the Parliament of Western Australia granted assent on 24 December 1912, authorised the construction of the railway line from Wagin to Bowelling.

The Wagin to Bowelling railway line's contract for construction was awarded on 17 July 1914. It was constructed by the Western Australian Public Works Department. The first section of the line, from Wagin to Bokal, was opened on 20 November 1917 while the second section, from Bokal to Bowelling, was opened on 10 December 1918.

With the opening of the railway junction at Bowelling, station and town there were prioritised over Darkan. Darkan station was closed while the Bowelling remained in operation until 1967. The last direct train from Bowelling to Wagin ran on 30 June 1984 while the Bowelling to Bokal section was closed on 1 June 1986. Westrail continued some operations from Wagin and Bokal until 1988.

== Legacy ==
The railway line is designated as "Not in use" on the Public Transport Authority map and, unlike other active and inactive Wheatbelt railway lines, is not leased to Arc Infrastructure and therefore not shown on its map.

The heritage listed Wagin Railway Station was completed on 25 April 1911, replacing an early building that was relocated in 1906.

The neighbouring Shire of West Arthur has a number of railway related installations on its heritage list. Some, like the Darkan railway station precinct and the Hillman River railway bridge are only connected to the Brunswick Junction to Narrogin line, while the Bowelling railway station is associated with both lines. Unlike these, the Duranillin railway bridge over the Arthur River was constructed for the Wagin to Bowelling line.
