= List of acts of the Parliament of Western Australia from 1953 =

This is a list of acts of the Parliament of Western Australia for the year 1953.

== 1953 ==
=== Public acts ===
Short title, or popular name	Citation	Royal assent
Long title
	No. 1 of 1953	1 September 1953
An Act to apply out of the Consolidated Revenue Fund the sum of Ten Million Five Hundred Thousand Pounds and from Moneys to Credit of the General Loan Fund Four Million Pounds, to the Service of the Year ending 30th June, 1954, and to apply out of the Public Account the sum of One Million Five Hundred Thousand Pounds for the purpose of temporary Advances to be made by the Treasurer.
Wheat Marketing Act 1953	No. 2 of 1953	27 October 1953
An Act to amend the Wheat Industry Stabilisation Act, 1948-1952. (Note: Wheat Industry Stabilisation Act 1948 (No. 75))
Collie–Griffin Mine Railway Act 1953	No. 13 of 1953	10 November 1953
An Act to constitute portion of the Collie–Griffin Mine Railway Siding a Government Railway and for other purposes.
Royal Powers Act 1953	No. 46 of 1953	29 December 1953
An Act relating to the exercise by the Queen of Powers under Acts of the Parliament.
	No. X of 1953	
Appropriation Act 1953-54	No. 89 of 1953	21 January 1954
An Act to appropriate and apply out of the Consolidated Revenue Fund and from Moneys to Credit of the General Loan Fund and from the Public Account certain sums to make good the supplies granted for the service of the Year ending the thirtieth day of June, One thousand nine hundred and fifty-four, and to supplement grants made by the previous Parliament during its last Session in adjustment of the Vote "Advance to Treasurer, 1952-53" for charges during the Year ended the 30th day of June, 1953; and to approve of certain expenditure under section forty-one of the Forests Act, 1918-1931. (Note: Forests Act 1918 (No. 8 of 1919))

=== Private acts ===
Short title, or popular name	Citation	Royal assent
Long title
Collie Club Act 1953	Private Act of 1953	20 November 1953
An Act to resolve certain difficulties concerning the legal position of The Collie Club Limited, a Company duly registered under the Companies Act, 1893, (Note: Companies Act 1893 (56 Vict. No. 8)) and to vest the assets of the Company in an Association to be formed and registered under the Associations Incorporation Act, 1895-1947, (Note: Associations Incorporation Act 1895 (59 Vict. No. 20)) and for other purposes arising out of such difficulties and incidental to such vesting.
Kalgoorlie and Boulder Racing Clubs Act Amendment Act 1953	Private Act of 1953	3 November 1953
An Act to give effect to the amalgamation of the Kalgoorlie Racing Club and the Boulder Racing Club in a new Club formed for the purpose of such amalgamation styled "The Kalgoorlie-Boulder Racing Club" and to vest the assets of the first mentioned club in such new Club and to confer on such new Club power to acquire by purchase or otherwise and to hold and otherwise deal with real and personal property for the purposes of the Club and for other purposes.

== Sources ==
- "legislation.wa.gov.au".
