= Moodiarrup =

Locality in Western Australia

- Town
- Coordinates: 33°36′25″S 116°44′20″E
- Country: Australia
- State: Western Australia
- LGA(s): Shire of West Arthur

Government
  - State electorate(s): Roe
  - Federal division(s): O'Connor

Area
  - Total: 156.4 km^{2} (60.4 sq mi)
- Elevation: 251 m (823 ft)

Population
  - Total(s): 63 (SAL 2021)
- Postcode: 6393

Moodiarrup is a locality in Western Australia, located to the south of Darkan within the Shire of West Arthur. The locality is situated at an average elevation of 251 metres above sea level. As of the 2021 Australian census, it had a population of 63.
