= Brunswick Junction to Narrogin railway line =

Partially operational railway line in Western Australia

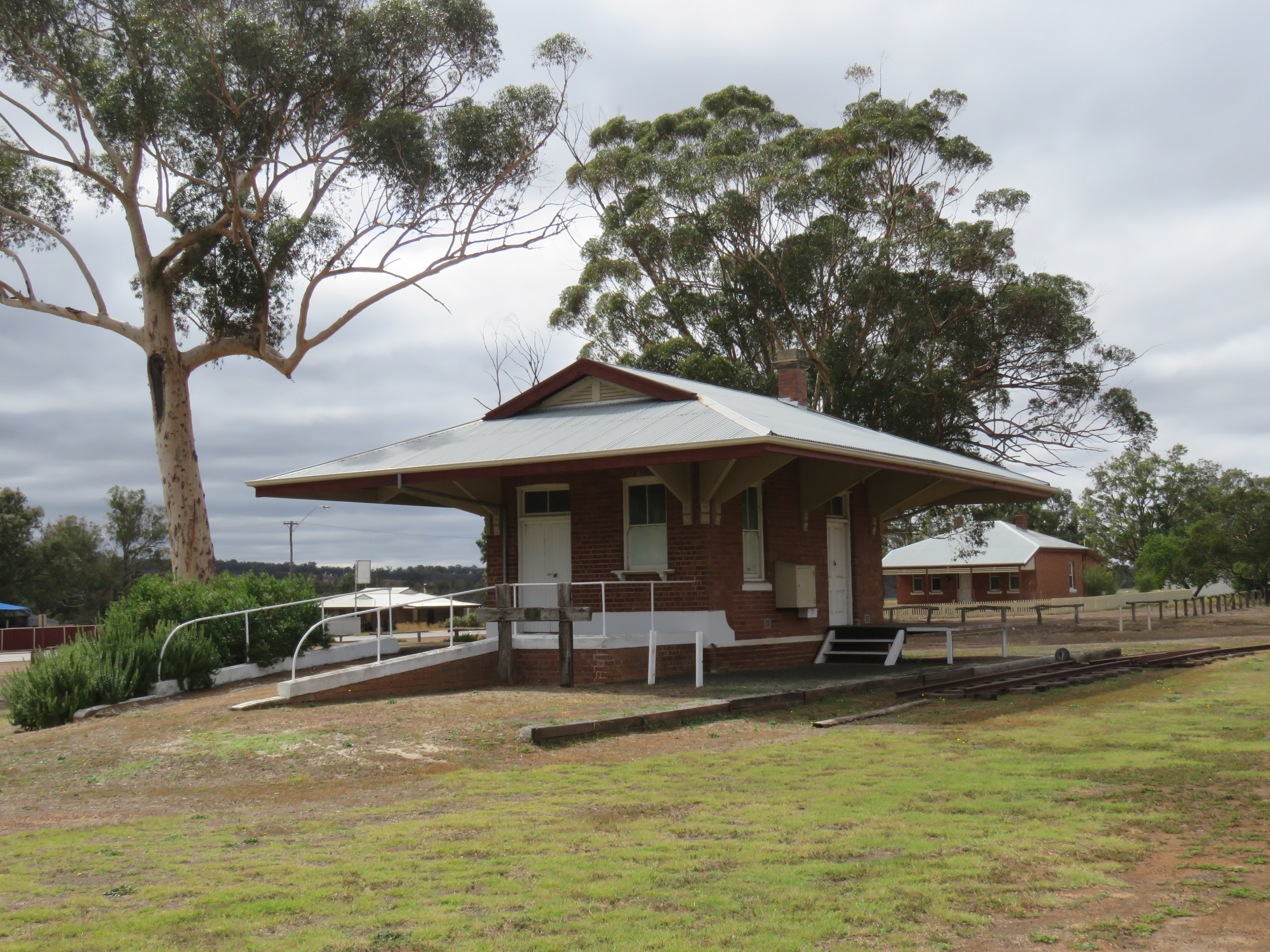
- The heritage listed Darkan Railway Station

Overview
- Status: Open: 53 kilometres (33 mi) Closed: 133 kilometres (83 mi)
- Locale: South West and Wheatbelt, Western Australia
- Termini: Brunswick Junction; Narrogin

History
- Commenced: 1898
- Opened: 7 October 1907
- Closed: 1988 (partially)

Technical
- Line length: 186 km (116 mi)
- Track gauge: 1,067 mm (3 ft 6 in)
- Brunswick Junction to Narrogin railway line Main locations

The Brunswick Junction to Narrogin railway line is a partially operational railway line in the South West and Wheatbelt regions of Western Australia, connecting Brunswick Junction via Collie and Bowelling to Narrogin.

The line was 186 kilometres (116 mi) long but only the western-most 53 kilometres (33 mi) from Brunswick Junction to the Premier Coal mine are still in service. At Brunswick Junction, the railway line connects to the South Western Railway while, at Narrogin, it connected to the Great Southern Railway and Merredin to Narrogin railway line. At Bowelling, it also connected to the Wagin to Bowelling railway line. In its western section, the line also had a number of spur lines, some of which are still active.

== History ==
The Great Southern Railway, passing through Narrogin, was established in 1889, having been constructed in a three-year period from 1886, while the South Western Railway, passing through what would become Brunswick Junction, opened in 1893.

The Collie Coalfields Railway Act 1895, an act by the Parliament of Western Australia granted assent on 12 October 1895, authorised the construction of the railway line to Collie from an unnamed point on the South Western Railway, soon after to become Brunswick Junction. The Collie Quarry Railway Act 1897, on 23 December 1897, authorised the construction of a short section of railway line connecting the South Western to the Brunswick Junction to Collie railway.

The Brunswick Junction to Collie railway line was completed in early 1898, connecting the coal mining town of Collie to the South Western Railway at Brunswick Junction. In 1903, a railway line from Collie to Collie Cardiff was constructed and opened on 2 November 1903. The line was constructed by the Western Australian Public Works Department (PWD) and latter extended with the expansion of the coal mining in the area, becoming a spur line once the main line from Collie to Darkan commenced.

The Collie–Narrogin Railway Act 1904, assented to on 16 January 1904, authorised the construction of the railway line from Collie to Narrogin.

On 22 March 1905, the contract for the Narrogin to Darkan railway line was awarded to the PWD and the new line was opened on 7 September 1906. Shortly after, on 14 September 1906, the Collie to Darkan section was awarded for construction to the PWD. This final section of the Brunswick Junction to Narrogin railway was opened on 7 October 1907.

The Merredin to Narrogin railway line opened on 14 September 1914, having gradually been constructed since 1908, and thereby connecting the line with the Eastern Goldfields Railway at Merredin.

On 10 October 1918, the Wagin to Bowelling railway line was opened, connecting this line to the Brunswick Junction to Narrogin railway at Bowelling.

Operations on the Narrogin to Collie section of the railway line ceased in 1988. The section of the line still active from Brunswick Junction past Collie to the Premier Coal mine is now leased by Arc Infrastructure while the remainder is designated as "Not in use" by the Public Transport Authority.

== Branch lines ==
Apart from the original Collie to Collie Cardiff spur line from 1903, a number of other branch lines existed. The former was authorised in 1902, when the Collie–Collie-Boulder Railway Act 1902 was assented to on 20 December 1902.

In late 1951, the construction of two spur lines was approved by the Western Australian government. The Muja–Centaur Coal Mine Railway Act 1951, assented to on 20 November 1951, authorised the construction of a spur line from Muja, east of Collie, to the Centaur coal mine, while the Collie–Cardiff Railway Act 1951, assented to on 20 December 1951, authorised the construction of an extension of the spur to Collie Cardiff. From Collie Cardiff, the line was extended to the Western No. 2 coal mine, operated by Western Collieries Ltd.

In 1967, the spur line from Collie to the Griffin mine, constructed after the Collie–Griffin Mine Railway Act 1953, was closed with the Railway (Collie–Griffin Mine Railway) Discontinuance Act 1967, assented to on 21 November 1967, an act repealed on 4 July 2006 with the Statute Law Revision Act 2006.

In 1973, the Alumina Refinery (Worsley) Agreement Act 1973, assented to on 28 November 1973, authorised the construction of an alumina refinery at Worsley and an associated railway line from the refinery to the existing railway line between Brunswick Junction and Collie.

== Legacy ==
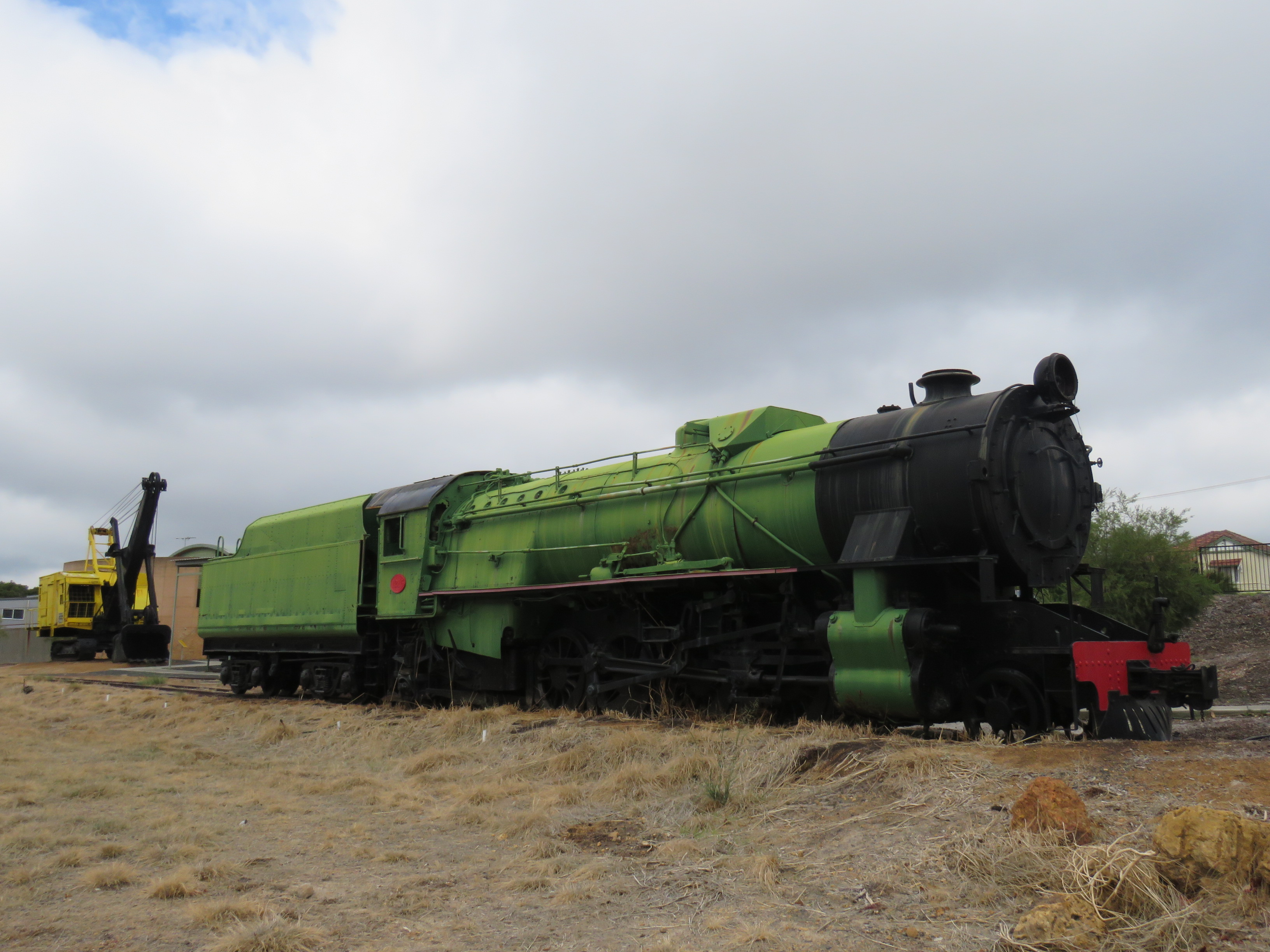
A WAGR V class at the Collie Railway Memorial with the Ruston-Bucyrus mechanical shovel in the background

At the eastern terminus of the line, the Narrogin railway station, built in 1907, is on the Western Australian State Register of Heritage Places. The heritage listed installations at Narrogin also include a goods shed, a signal cabin, a foot bridge and a number of associated houses.

Further west, in the Shire of Williams, a number of heritage listed sites date to the former railway line, the sites of the Dardadine and Congelin and Josbury railway sidings, the Congelin railway dam and the Williams railway station.

In the Shire of West Arthur, a number of railway related installations are on the shire's heritage list. The Darkan railway station precinct and the Hillman River railway bridge were once part of the Brunswick Junction to Narrogin line, while the Bowelling railway station is associated with both this line and the Wagin to Bowelling one.

In the Shire of Collie, the Collie railway goods shed, footbridge and round house, with turntable, are on the State Register of Heritage Places. Additionally, the Collie railway station rose garden, the Coal Machinery Memorial, Railway Museum and Collie Railway Memorial at the Collie Visitors Centre are on the shire's heritage register.

At the western terminus, at Brunswick Junction, the site of the former railway station is on the Shire of Harvey's heritage list. A station at Brunswick was constructed in 1898, and rebuilt with a large two-storey building in 1947. The station was demolished in 1982 and now just a shelter remains at the site.
