= Albany Highway =

Highway in Western Australia

Albany Highway Western Australia
- Map of the south-west of Western Australia, with Albany Highway highlighted in red

General information
- Type: Highway
- Length: 405.47 km (252 mi)
- Opened: 1863
- Route number(s): State Route 30; Alternate State Route 30 (Beckenham−Kenwick)

Major junctions
- Northwest end: The Causeway (State Route 5), Victoria Park (Perth)
- Leach Highway (State Route 7); Tonkin Highway (State Route 4); Brookton Highway (State Route 40); Armadale Road (State Route 14); South Western Highway (State Route 20); Coalfields Highway (State Route 107); Great Southern Highway (State Route 120); Muir Highway (State Route 102); South Coast Highway (National Route 1)
- Southeast end: York Street, Albany

Location(s)
- Major settlements: Armadale, North Bannister, Williams, Arthur River, Kojonup, Cranbrook, Mount Barker, Albany

Highway system
- Highways in Australia; National Highway • Freeways in Australia; Highways in Western Australia

Albany Highway links Western Australia's capital city Perth with its oldest settlement, Albany, on the state's south coast. The 405-kilometre-long (252 mi) highway travels through the southern Wheatbelt and Great Southern regions, and is designated State Route 30 for most of its length. Outside of Perth the highway is predominately a sealed, single carriageway with regular overtaking lanes in some undulating areas. Albany Highway commences at The Causeway, a river crossing that connects to Perth's central business district. The highway heads south-east through Perth's metropolitan region, bypassed in part by Shepperton Road and Kenwick Link, and continues south-eastwards through to Albany. It intersects several major roads in Perth, including the Leach, Tonkin, Brookton, and South Western highways. The rural section of Albany Highway connects to important regional roads at the few towns and roadhouses along the route, including Coalfields Highway at Arthur River, Great Southern Highway at Cranbrook, and Muir Highway at Mount Barker.

Prior to European settlement, the indigenous Noongar people had a considerable network of tracks, including a trade route between the areas now known as Perth and Albany. Construction of a road between Perth and Albany began soon after the naming of Albany in 1832, but progress was slow, with only 16 miles (26 km) completed by 1833. A monthly mail route which operated in the 1840s had such trouble with the journey that a new contractor was required each year, and from 1847 the mail route detoured via Bunbury. The introduction of convicts in 1850, and thus convict labour, allowed a road along the direct route to be fully constructed by 1863.

The rise of the motor vehicle era in the early 20th century saw the road gain prominence once more, and by 1939 the whole road had been sealed. Congestion at the Perth end of the road in the 1930s led to parallel roads Berwick Street and Shepperton Road being upgraded to provide bypasses. The entire Perth−Albany road was renamed Albany Highway on 2 October 1940, in recognition of its importance as an arterial traffic route. From the late 1970s, $49 million over ten years was spent on repairing Albany Highway, and the experience saw Main Roads develop a program of interventions to prevent costly road reconstruction. Since the 1990s Main Roads has been upgrading various portions along the length of Albany Highway, including widening sections to dual carriageways in Perth, and the construction of the Kenwick Link bypass.

== Route description ==
Albany Highway commences at The Causeway, a river crossing that connects to Perth's central business district. The highway heads south-east through Perth's metropolitan region, and continues through the southern Wheatbelt and Great Southern regions to Albany on the south coast of Western Australia. Albany Highway is generally a two-lane single carriageway road, but with additional lanes and dual-carriageway sections in Perth and Albany. The highway is allocated State Route 30, except for bypassed sections in Perth, and the southernmost portion in Albany. The part bypassed by Kenwick Link is allocated Alternate State Route 30, and a short length in Arthur River is concurrently allocated State Route 107. Albany Highway also carries sections of Heritage Country Tourist Drive (Tourist Drive 205) and Great Southern Tourist Way (Tourist Drive 356).

Main Roads Western Australia monitors traffic volume across the state's road network, including various locations along Albany Highway. In the 2013/14 financial year, the recorded traffic volumes ranged between 3880 and 70,690 vehicles per weekday in Perth, 1980 to 3880 in the Wheatbelt, and 1720 to 5120 in the Great Southern. The highest percentage of heavy traffic was 29.2%, south of Jarrahdale Road in the Wheatbelt. Reports commissioned by the Royal Automobile Club of Western Australia (RAC) in 2006 and 2008 gave the majority of the highway a three-star safety rating out of five, with an approximately 20-kilometre-long (12 mi) section south-east of Armadale rated at a two star level. The overall highway network was generally rated as three-star or four-star, but around 10% in 2006 and 5% in 2008 received a two-star rating.

=== Perth to Armadale ===
In Perth, Albany Highway's north-western terminus is at a parclo interchange with The Causeway, Shepperton Road, and Great Eastern and Canning Highways in Victoria Park. The first 200 metres (660 ft) of the road is one-way into the interchange, but only connecting to The Causeway and Canning Highway – there is no direct access to the other roads. For the next four kilometres (2.5 mi), the highway is a two-lane, two-way high street serving Victoria Park's town centre, and continuing south-east through East Victoria Park. The nearby four-lane Shepperton Road serves as a bypass, carrying through-traffic as well as State Route 30.

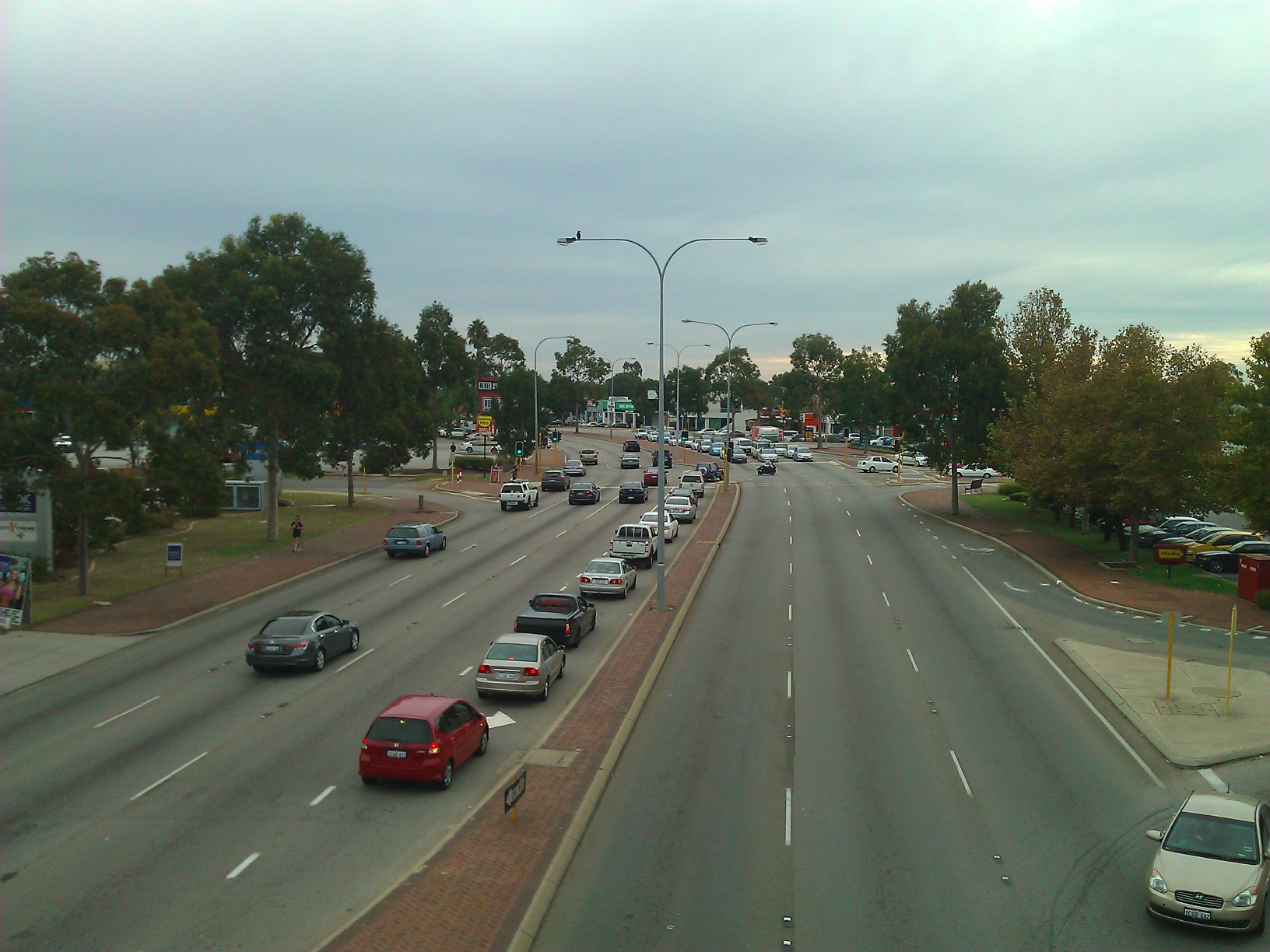
Albany Highway as a dual carriageway in Cannington

The two roads converge at an intersection with Welshpool Road, and for 15 kilometres (9.3 mi) Albany Highway serves as an arterial route in Perth's south-eastern suburbs, varying between a single carriageway and dual carriageway, and between a four- and six-lane capacity. This part of the highway is dominated by commercial shopping precincts in Bentley, Cannington, Maddington, Gosnells and Kelmscott, with numerous sets of traffic lights. The section of Albany Highway through Beckenham and Kenwick is allocated Alternate State Route 30, while State Route 30 follows a bypass, Kenwick Link.

Albany Highway has a folded diamond interchange with Tonkin Highway in Gosnells, and continues south for seven kilometres (4.3 mi) past commercial and residential properties in Kelmscott and Mount Nasura. The highway has a T junction that is the western terminus of Brookton Highway, at the boundary between Kelmscott, and Mount Nasura. Further south in Armadale, the highway intersects the eastern end of Armadale Road and northern end of South Western Highway.

=== Regional highway ===
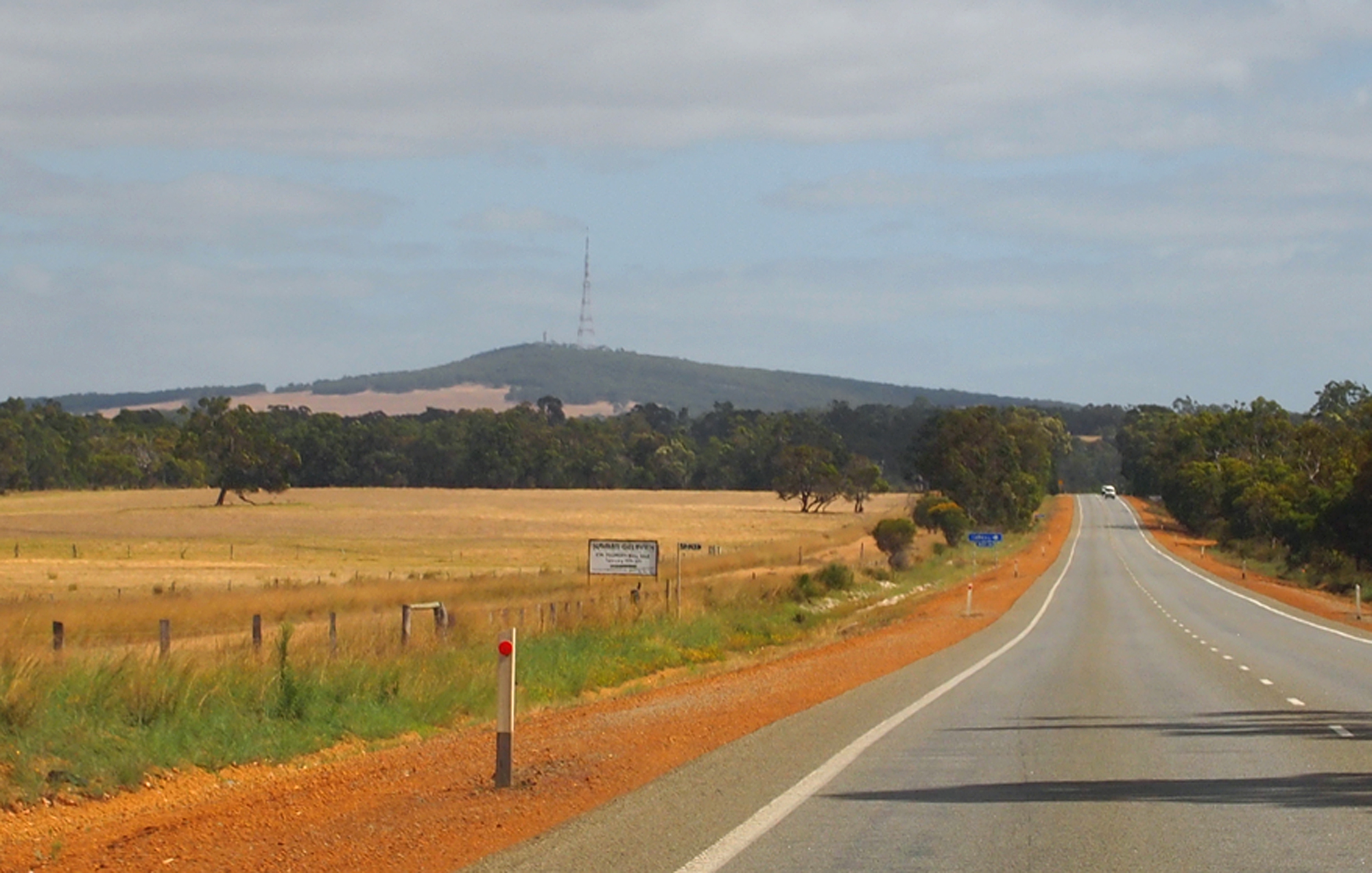
Two-lane highway section near Mount Barker

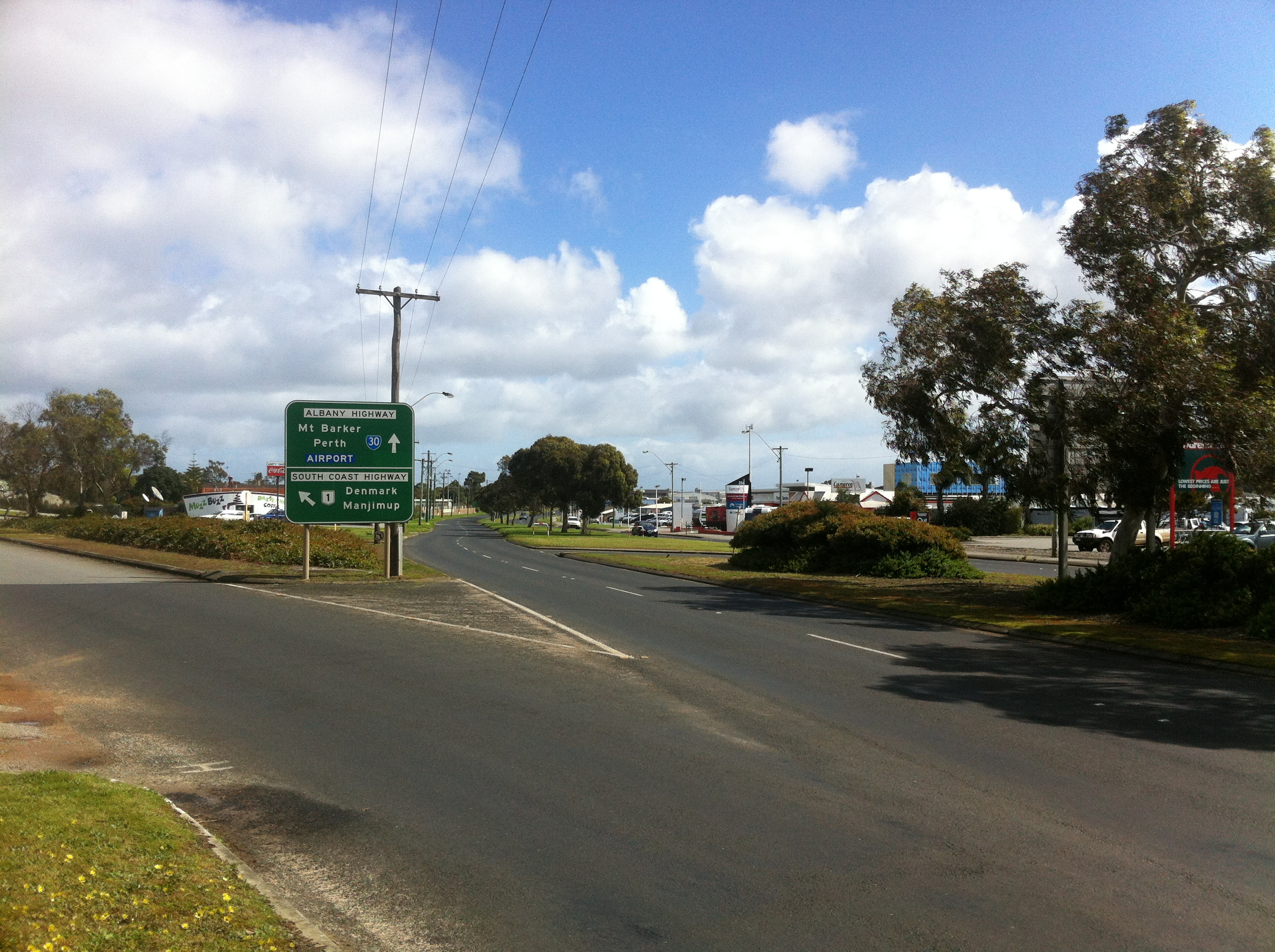
Albany Highway and South Coast Highway intersection outside Albany

Albany Highway proceeds east and then south from Armadale, around the suburb of Mount Richon. The road continues south-east, with signs of human activity becoming more sparse as the highway crosses the Darling Scarp, and the scenery transitions to native forest. Further south, after 60 kilometres (37 mi), it transitions again to pastures, with farming activities such as livestock rearing and orchards. Over the next 300 kilometres (190 mi), the highway encounters few towns: Williams, Kojonup and Mount Barker are on the highway, but are 100 kilometres (62 mi) apart. Roadhouses exist at North Bannister, Crossman and Arthur River, while many of the service towns in the region are approximately 30 kilometres (20 mi) to the east on Great Southern Highway, including Narrogin, Wagin and Katanning.

Closer to Albany, there are large tracts of blue gum eucalypt plantations. Twelve kilometres (7.5 mi) from the road's south-eastern terminus, it passes Albany Airport. The highway passes by suburban areas before intersecting South Coast Highway at a Y intersection, and only 100 metres (330 ft) beyond it, a large five-way roundabout. This roundabout is the southern terminus of State Route 30, and connects the highway with Chester Pass Road (which continues east to South Coast Highway), North Road, and Hanrahan Road. The final two-and-a-half-kilometre (1.6 mi) stretch takes the highway south-east into the centre of Albany.

== History ==
=== Background ===
Prior to European settlement, the indigenous Noongar people had a considerable network of tracks around their territory in the south-west of Western Australia. One such track, used as a trade route, linked the Swan River (in modern-day Perth) with the area now known as Albany. The track followed a similar alignment to modern-day Albany Highway.

On 25 December 1826, the New South Wales colonial government brig Amity, under the command of Major Edmund Lockyer, arrived at King George Sound to establish a military garrison. On 21 January 1827, as instructed by the Colonial Secretary, the Union Jack was raised and a feu de joie fired by the troops, formally annexing the territory, in assertion of the first official claim by the Imperial Government to British possession over the whole continent of Australia. On 7 March 1831 the King George Sound and colony was made part of the Swan River Colony and a free settlement. Albany was officially named by Governor Stirling at the beginning of 1832, at the time that political authority passed to the Swan River colony. The construction of a road from Albany to Perth began soon thereafter, but only 16 miles (26 km) had been completed by 1833. Due to this slow progress, the settlers of Albany petitioned England to supply convicts to work on the road. At the time the government in Perth derided the proposal, and Western Australia would not become a penal colony until 1849.

=== Surveying and initial routes ===
In October and November 1835, Governor Stirling and Surveyor-General John Septimus Roe travelled overland from Perth to Albany, with the focus of the journey being the route south of the Hotham River. A more comprehensive survey was undertaken in July–September 1836 by Assistant Surveyors Alfred Hillman and D. Smith. Hillman started from the Albany end, while Smith concurrently commenced from Perth. A few months later, in February 1837, Hillman accompanied a group that made the trip to Perth in 12 days travelling time, journeying via Chorkurup, Thokokup, Mount Barker, Lake Matilda, Kojonup, Williams and Arthur River. This group was led by Mr J. Harris, and included Lieutenant Armstrong with eight soldiers of the 21st Fusiliers, Albany settlers Patrick Taylor and Dr. Thomas Harrison, as well as Kartrull, who was referred to as "the native 'Handsome'". The place where they arrived in Williams was right opposite the road from Kelmscott to Williams, Mr Harris describe Hillnman as please having previously survey the route from Perth to Kelmscott. In April 1838 four bridges were built near Albany by John Young, and in 1839 Governor John Hutt ventured out to Albany on an official visit, travelling through Williams and Kojonup. Assistant Surveyor Hillman led a large group of Albany settlers to Perth in 1840, via Kinunup, Yarenup, Joseph's Wells, Balgarrup and Mandalup; whilst in the same year Edward John Eyre shepherded 550 sheep and 70 cattle from Albany to York, and then over to Perth.

A monthly mail route was set up in June 1841, travelling from Albany to Perth via Kojonup and Williams. The following year, a service through Guildford commenced. The tough conditions of the mail route saw a different contractor providing the service each year. The 1845 contractor James Martin had particular trouble with debts, which led to his mail horse being seized; while he managed to acquire a replacement animal, he also had trouble servicing the resultant debt of £2. In 1847, the Perth–Albany route was adjusted, so that the mail would travel from Albany to Kojonup, then head to Bunbury on the coast, and subsequently up to Perth via Rockingham and Fremantle. The new route still had difficulties, such as flooding in the winter of 1847 that resulted in a "terrible trip" which took a month to complete. The people of Albany, who could travel as passengers on the mail cart, found the trip to Perth long and deplorable.

With the arrival of the convict ship Scindian on 1 June 1850 and the advent of convict labour, early completion of the Perth–Albany road seemed assured. Investigations of a direct route via Kelmscott, Hotham, Williams and Kojonup began in late 1851. Assistant Surveyor A. C. Gregory reported in 1852 that the direct route would be 57 miles (92 km) shorter than the route via Bunbury, and 40 miles (64 km) shorter than the York route. Construction was recommended in late 1852, after the mail contractor George Maxwell completed a journey along the proposed route in September, and soon commenced. Fifty miles (80 km) had been completed by October 1853, and the whole road was finished in 1863. The road served as the main link between Perth and Albany until the 1880s, when the Great Southern Railway opened.

=== Early 20th century ===
The rise of the motor vehicle era in the early 20th century saw the road gain prominence once more. The newly formed Main Roads Board (Note: Predecessor to the Main Roads Department, later renamed Main Roads Western Australia) took over control and maintenance of the Perth–Albany road and twenty-one other important roads between 1926 and 1928, which were declared "main roads". At this stage the Perth–Albany road was not much more developed than a bush track. To increase the usability of the overall main road network, the Board's work schedule prioritised upgrading the worst individual segments, rather than any one road. In 1928/29, twenty-two separate sections of the Perth–Albany road were improved, but many were short, and drivers would experience quite varied conditions, from new sealed road to gravel road, and then a boggy dirt in just a few miles. By 1932, the improved conditions allowed an average speed of 35 to 40 miles per hour (55 to 65 km/h) to be reached, for a total trip of eight to nine hours instead of two days. In 1938, a total of eight miles (13 km) had been sealed, and the following year the whole route had been completed.

In 1935, a town planning report for the City of Perth noted traffic congestion on Albany Road (Note: The locally-used name for the Perth–Albany road) in Victoria Park. As widening the existing road would have left the council liable for compensation from affected businesses and properties, the provision of bypass routes was recommended instead. To provide the bypasses, parallel roads would be upgraded and extended: Berwick Street to the south-west, and Shepperton Road to the north-east. In 1937, work had progressed on extending Berwick Street eastwards, and it had been extended to Alday Street by November 1938. A new causeway to extend Berwick Street north over the Swan River, and make it a truck route, was considered by the state government in 1940. The existing Causeway, from which Albany Road commenced, had experienced almost a doubling of traffic volume between 1930 and 1939. However, the new Causeway was eventually constructed adjacent to old Causeway, which was then demolished.

The cooperation of the Canning Road District would be required to continue the Berwick Street bypass south-east beyond the city's boundary at Boundary Road, and ultimately through to Albany Road. The South Perth Road Board was also in favour of such a bypass, which would improve access for South Perth residents. A deputation from the Canning and South Perth Road Boards to the Acting Minister For Works, Mr E. H. Gray, in June 1940 complained about the congestion in Albany Road. The traffic delays were worsened by cars parked on both sides of the road and slow-moving trams. The deputation suggested extending Berwick Street to Albany Highway as the solution, as well as removing the trams. Gray contended that parking should be prohibited, and refused to scrap the trams, but said he would consider the resumption of land east of Berwick Street to enable a one-quarter-mile (0.40 km) extension to Albany Road. However, Berwick Street was diverted to the south-west to connect with Chapman Road, providing a longer continuous route west of Albany Highway.

Shepperton Road ran parallel to Albany Road between Harvey Street, 45 chains (3,000 ft; 910 m) from The Causeway, and Somerset Street, one and a half miles (2.4 km) further along. In 1937, a road from Asquith Street to Albany Road was constructed, to eventually link in with Shepperton Road. In the same year, the intersection of Albany Road, Milford Street, and Welshpool Road was reconfigured to improve visibility, and in anticipation of an eastern extension to Shepperton Road. In April 1940, that extension was nearing completion, which was expected to be by the end of May, while the demolition of houses on land resumed for the western extension was being arranged. On 29 September 1941, the Perth City Council decided to construct the link between Asquith Street and Harvey Street early the following year, completing the Shepperton Road bypass. Buses were rerouted onto Shepperton Road in 1946, by which time it had become the preferred route for motorists.

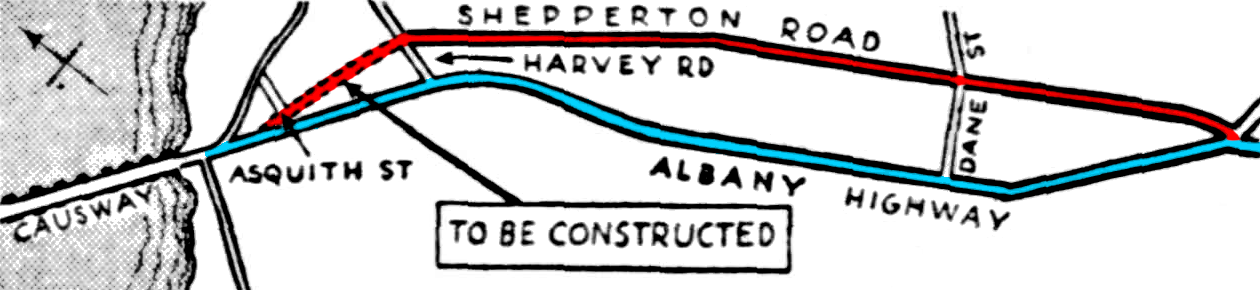
Shepperton Road (red) bypass of Albany Highway (blue). In September 1941 the section between Asquith Street and Harvey Street was yet to be constructed.

In November 1939, the State Advisory Committee on Nomenclature recommended that the Perth–Albany road be named Great Southern Highway, in recognition of its importance as an arterial traffic route. This suggestion followed on from the naming of Great Eastern Highway, in April of the previous year. The committee sent letters to all the local governments in the area to advise them of the proposal. Feedback was mixed; whilst the name was "thoroughly approved" by the Tambellup Road Board, and the Perth City Council's general purposes committee recommended that no objection be raised, the Kojonup Road Board believed that "sufficient grounds [did] not exist for the proposed change", and the Albany Municipal Council objected strongly to not retaining "Perth–Albany" in the name.

The State Advisory Committee made a new recommendation in April 1940 for Albany Highway instead of Great Southern Highway. This new proposal received support from the Albany Municipal Council and Tambellup Road Board. However, the Perth City Council still preferred Great Southern Highway, and recommended that within its boundaries – from The Causeway to Welshpool – the road be named Albany Road, and that one of the proposed bypasses in the area would be better suited to the highway name. The entire road was renamed Albany Highway on 2 October 1940, superseding the previously used names Albany Road, Perth–Albany Road, and High Street in Kojonup.

=== Post-World War II ===
During World War II, the Main Roads Department focused its activities on the war effort. Roads in rural areas deteriorated, especially after the Pearl Harbor attack brought the war to the Pacific, and only the most urgent maintenance works were authorised on roads for civilian purposes. Following the war, Main Roads returned to its usual operations, repairing and maintaining the road network. The rural road network expanded in the 1950s, with Main Roads both repairing the worst segments of its roads, through numerous small jobs, and assisting local governments to seal their roads. Such activity was spurred on by the closure of railway lines in addition to the establishment of new land settlements.

In Perth, a roundabout was constructed at the north-western end of Albany Highway, to improve the flow of traffic onto and off The Causeway. It opened in 1952, with guides on the usage of the roundabout published in newspapers. In 1973 construction began to upgrade the intersection to a partial cloverleaf interchange at the eastern end of The Causeway. The $1.3 million interchange opened on 8 March 1974.

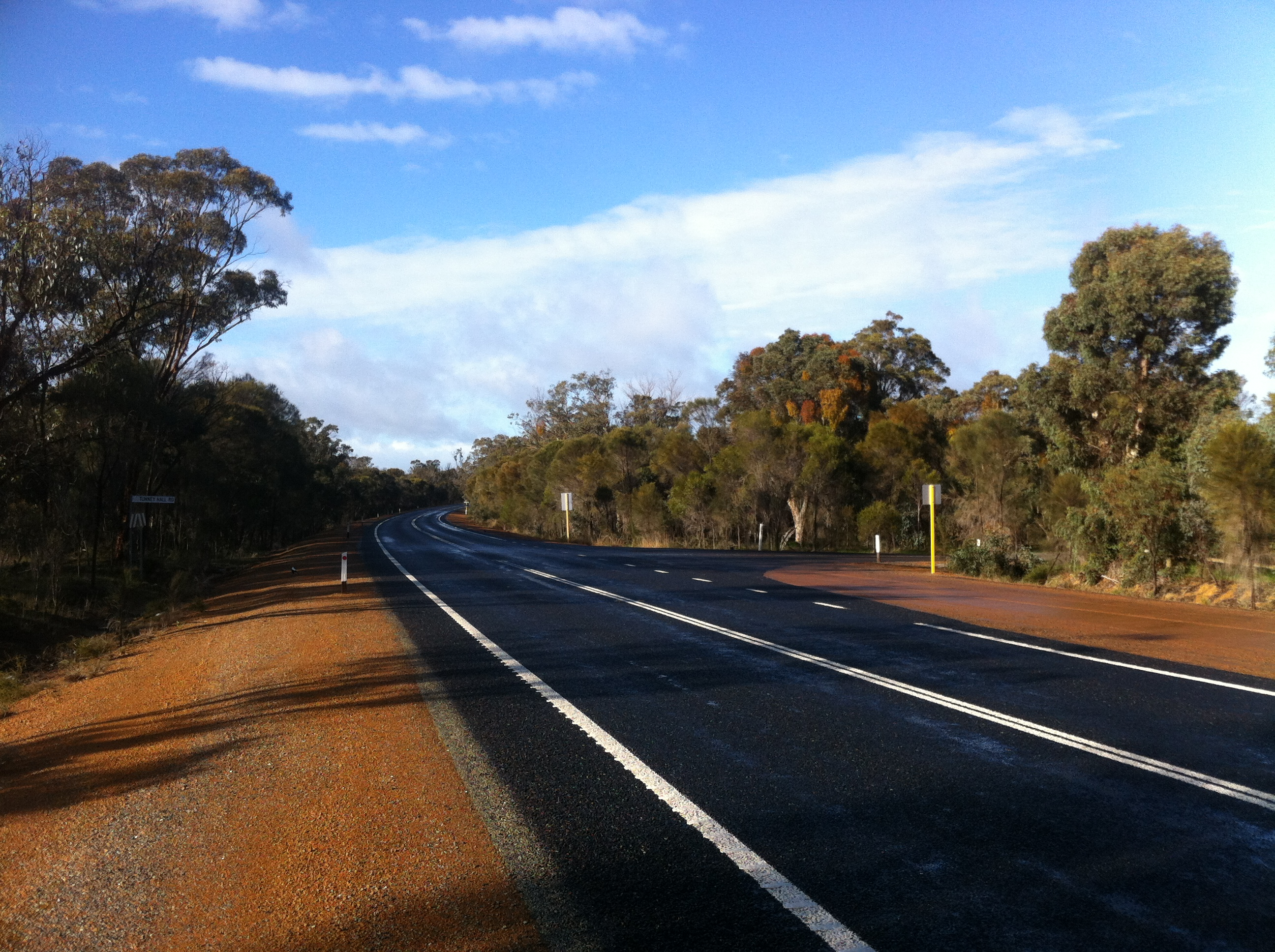
Albany Highway facing south near Tunney

By the late 1970s, the road sections sealed in the 1950s and 1960s were in need of repair or maintenance to prolong the pavement life. Old bitumen surfaces would deteriorate and crack. Resealing such cracks was a high priority, as expensive reconstruction would be required if water was allowed to enter the road base. Over a ten-year period, $49 million was spent on repairing Albany Highway. The techniques used in this process were then formalised into the 4R Program, which aimed to alleviate a growing maintenance problem – based on a thirty-five-year pavement lifespan, the amount of reconstruction required would be more than double the actual rate of reconstruction. (Note: For example, in 1986, 290 kilometres (180 mi) of reconstruction would be required per year (over the next ten years), yet in the previous year only 90 kilometres (56 mi) of road was actually reconstructed) "4R" abbreviated the options that could be used keep roads serviceable:

- Restoration – maintaining the condition of a road
- Resurfacing – resealing a bitumen surface which was no longer waterproof, to prevent pavement failure
- Rehabilitation – improving a deteriorated road to its original condition
- Reconstruction – done when deterioration was beyond the point of repairs

Interventions to prevent a road requiring reconstruction, the most costly option, would save money.

From the 1980s Main Roads began planning for the future needs of Albany Highway within the City of Canning in Perth, in conjunction with the City and the Metropolitan Region Planning Authority. A three-kilometre (2 mi) section between Leach Highway and Nicholson Road was subsequently upgraded between November 1992 and June 1994. The four-lane undivided road had been one of the most congested in Perth but was improved by adding a third lane in each direction as well as a median strip. The project was recognised with an Excellence Award from the Institution of Engineers Australia in 1994. In the 1990s several other improvement projects were planned across the length of the highway, including between Bedfordale and North Bannister, through Mount Barker, and between Narrikup and Albany. Closer to Perth, the section along Bedfordale Hill (south-east of Armadale) was upgraded to a four-lane dual carriageway, with work completed in June 1999.

This period also saw the planning and construction of additional junctions with new major roads in Perth. At Armadale, Armadale Road would connect to what had been a three-way junction with South Western Highway, while a highway deviation was proposed to connect to the extension of Roe Highway through Beckenham. The proposed deviation became Kenwick Link, constructed as part of the Roe Highway extension towards Fremantle. It was initially built as a single carriageway, and upgraded to a dual carriageway later. It opened on 17 April 1998, ahead of the Roe Highway extensions from Welshpool Road to Kenwick Link (opened 30 November 2002) and from Kenwick Link to Nicholson Road (opened 21 January 2003).

Further work was undertaken in Perth in 2011 and 2012, between John Street in Bentley and Leach Highway. The road was widened and a median installed to increase both safety and efficiency. The works also upgraded intersection, including installation of new traffic lights. Downer EDI Works Pty Ltd completed the work under a $3.65 million contract. In January 2014, work began on widening and reconstructing 2.4 kilometres (1.5 mi) of Albany Highway north of Kojonup.

== Major intersections ==
LGA	Location	km (Note: Lengths are measured from the north-west end of The Causeway, and along Shepperton Road in Victoria Park and East Victoria. This is 1.24 kilometres (0.77 mi) longer than the section of Albany Highway from its north-western terminus to the Shepperton Road / Welshpool Road intersection.)	mi	Destinations	Notes
Victoria Park	Burswood–Victoria Park boundary	1.27	0.79	Canning Highway (National Route 1 / State Route 6) southwest / The Causeway (State Route 5) northwest – Fremantle, Perth	Northwestern terminus; no access into Albany Highway; Canning Highway and The Causeway interchange with Great Eastern Highway (northeast) and Shepperton Road (southeast) – no access from Albany Highway
Victoria Park–Canning boundary	East Victoria Park–St James boundary	4.90	3.04	Shepperton Road (State Route 30) north / Welshpool Road east – Perth, East Cannington, Welshpool	Route transition: No route number northwest bound, State Route 30 southeast bound; Albany Highway southeast bound turns south, and northwest bound turns west. No right turns allowed from Shepperton Road to Albany Highway northwest bound or Albany Highway to Welshpool Road.
Canning	Bentley	6.70– 6.78	4.16– 4.21	Leach Highway (State Route 7) – Fremantle, Welshpool, Kewdale, Perth Airport	Diamond interchange (Leach Highway free flowing)
Canning	Cannington	7.49	4.65	Manning Road (State Route 26) west / Mallard Way northeast – Manning, Cannington	Traffic light intersection. No access from Mallard Way to Albany Highway or Manning Road nor from Albany Highway south to Manning Road
Gosnells	Beckenham	9.78	6.08	Nicholson Road – Fremantle, Canning Vale	Traffic light intersection
Gosnells	Beckenham	10.16	6.31	Kenwick Link (State Route 30) southeast to Roe Highway / William Street northeast – Armadale	Route transition: State Route 30 continues southeast as Kenwick Link; Alternate State Route 30 north-western terminus
Gosnells	Kenwick–Maddington boundary	13.65	8.48	Kenwick Link (State Route 30) northwest to Roe Highway / Austin Avenue northeast – Perth	Route transition: State Route 30 continues northwest as Kenwick Link; Alternate State Route 30 south-eastern terminus
Gosnells	Gosnells	17.19	10.68	Fremantle Road (State Route 36) – Langford	Traffic light intersection
Gosnells–Armadale boundary	Gosnells–Champion Lakes boundary	19.78– 20.11	12.29– 12.50	Tonkin Highway (State Route 4) – Welshpool, Bunbury, Perth Airport	Folded diamond interchange (Tonkin Highway free flowing)
Armadale	Kelmscott–Mt Nasura boundary	24.00	14.91	Brookton Highway (State Route 40) – Roleystone, Brookton, Araluen Botanic Park	Traffic light intersection
Armadale	Armadale	26.77	16.63	Armadale Road (State Route 14) west / South Western Highway (State Route 20) south – Armadale, Fremantle, Bunbury	South-eastbound traffic turns east, north-westbound traffic turns north
Serpentine-Jarrahdale–Wandering boundary	Jarrahdale–Mount Cooke boundary	53.22	33.07	Jarrahdale Road – Jarrahdale, Serpentine Dam	
Wandering–Boddington boundary	North Bannister	92.34	57.38	North Bannister Wandering Road – Wandering	
Wandering–Boddington boundary	Bannister	106.77	66.34	Bannister Marradong Road – Boddington	
Williams	Williams	158.70	98.61	Pinjarra Williams Road – Darkan, Collie, Pinjarra	
Williams	Williams	159.00	98.80	Williams Kondinin Road – Narrogin, Wickepin, Kulin	Signed as Williams–Narrogin Highway
West Arthur	Arthur River	196.39	122.03	Coalfields Highway (State Route 107) west – Collie, Bunbury	State Route 107 northern concurrency terminus
West Arthur	Arthur River	197.30	122.60	Arthur Road (State Route 107) east – Wagin, Dumbleyung, Lake Grace	State Route 107 southern concurrency terminus
West Arthur	Arthur River	197.71	122.85	Boyup Brook Arthur Road – Boyup Brook, Bridgetown	
Woodanilling	Beaufort River	219.69	136.51	Robinson Road – Woodanilling	
Kojonup	Kojonup	250.79	155.83	Collie Changerup Road – Darkan	
Kojonup	Kojonup	253.12	157.28	Kojonup–Katanning Road – Katanning	
Kojonup	Kojonup	254.47	158.12	Boyup Brook Kojonup Road – Frankland, Boyup Brook, Donnybrook	
Kojonup	Lumeah	279.91	173.93	Tambellup West Road – Tambellup	
Cranbrook	Cranbrook	316.19– 316.44	196.47– 196.63	Frankland Cranbrook Road – Frankland, Cranbrook	Staggered T junctions
Cranbrook	Cranbrook	319.74	198.68	Great Southern Highway (State Route 120) – Cranbrook, Katanning	
Plantagenet	Mount Barker	355.86	221.12	Muir Highway (State Route 102) west / Woogenellup Road east – Denmark, Manjimup	Roundabout
Plantagenet	Mount Barker	357.72	222.28	Oatlands Road (Tourist Drive 252) to Mount Barker Porongurup Road (Tourist Drive 252) – Porongurup, Porongurup National Park	
Albany	Willyung–Drome–McKail tripoint	398.11	247.37	Menang Drive (Albany Ring Road) to Chester Pass Road (National Route 1) – Esperance	
Albany	Lockyer–Orana boundary	404.07	251.08	South Coast Highway (National Route 1) west – Denmark, Manjimup	No access from Albany Highway southbound
Albany	Lockyer–Orana–Mount Melville–Centennial Park–Yakamia multipoint	404.19	251.15	Chester Pass Road (National Route 1) northeast to South Coast Highway (National Route 1) eastbound / North Road southeast / Hanrahan Road southwest – Lake Grace, Esperance, Middleton Beach, Emu Point, Frenchman Bay	Chester Pass Rotary; State Route 30 southern terminus; southbound access to South Coast Highway westbound via U-turn
Albany	Albany	406.71	252.72	Lokyer Avenue north / St Emilie Way east / York Street south	South-eastern highway terminus at roundabout
Concurrency terminus; Incomplete access; Route transition

== See also ==
- Highways in Australia
- List of highways in Western Australia
