= Arthur River, Western Australia =

Town in the Wheatbelt region of Western Australia

Arthur River
- Town
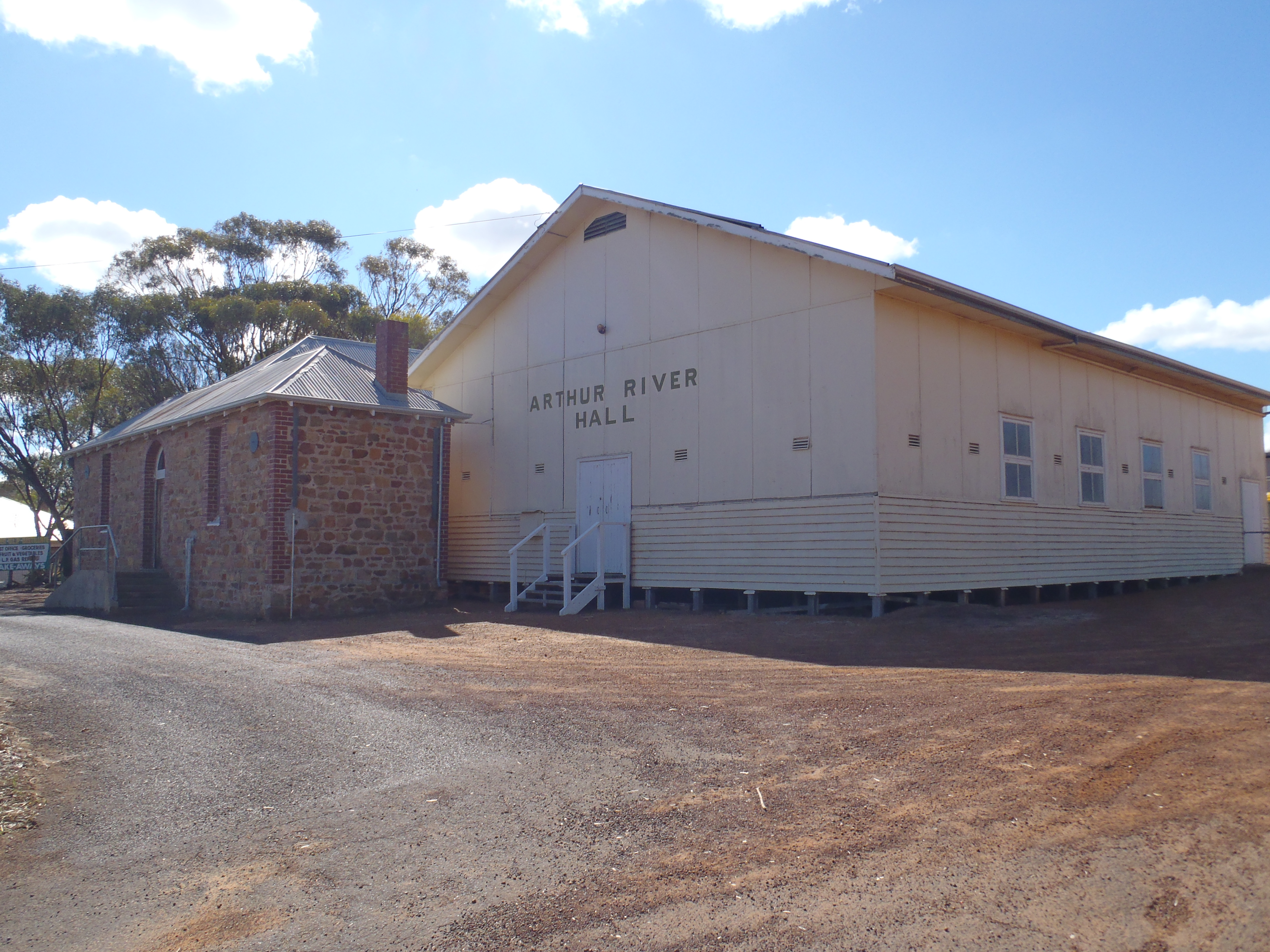
- Arthur River Hall on Albany Highway

- Interactive map of Arthur River
- Coordinates: 33°20′19″S 117°02′04″E
- Country: Australia
- State: Western Australia
- LGA: Shire of West Arthur
- Location: 197 km (122 mi) SSE of Perth; 30 km (19 mi) W of Wagin
- Established: 1850s

Government
  - State electorate: Roe
  - Federal division: O'Connor

Area
  - Total: 476.9 km^{2} (184.1 sq mi)
- Elevation: 290 m (950 ft)

Population
  - Total: 66 (SAL 2021)
- Postcode: 6315

Arthur River is a small town located in the Wheatbelt region of Western Australia, between Williams and Kojonup on the Albany Highway.

== History ==
The town is named after the Arthur River, which flows through it, a headwater of the Blackwood River. The river was named by Governor James Stirling in October 1835 after Arthur Trimmer who was a member of the exploring expedition led by the Stirling. Trimmer arrived in Western Australia in April 1831 and selected land at York. In 1836, he married Mary Ann, one of King George Sound Government Resident Sir Richard Spencer's daughters.

Following the introduction of convicts in Western Australia labour to the Swan River Colony in the early 1850s, the road from Perth to Albany was completed and a number of small settlements sprang up along it to support pastoralists who had been granted grazing leases in the area from as early as 1854. Arthur River gradually developed into a thriving centre with a police barracks and jail (1866), the Mount Pleasant Inn (1869), St Paul's Church (1885) still surviving to this day as remnants of the original settlement, and a post office, blacksmith, doctor and trading post also being built around that time. By the end of the century it was the major centre in the area.

The towns post office originally operated out of the inn. Mary Ann Spratt was appointed as the post mistress in 1866. The post office itself was not gazetted until 1892 which was the same year that the telegraph line was connected. The first telephone subscriber service commenced in 1913.

When the Great Southern Railway opened in 1889, much of the existing trade moved to new railway towns further east and many of the centres along the old "Coach Road" closed.

A bridge over the Arthur River was built in 1907 at Nobles Crossing.

Arthur River gained attention in January 2022 after an earthquake swarm started just north of the town. From 5 to 25 January the area recorded over 40 small earthquakes, with one peaking at 4.7 magnitude. This is typical of the South West Seismic Zone region.

== Present day ==
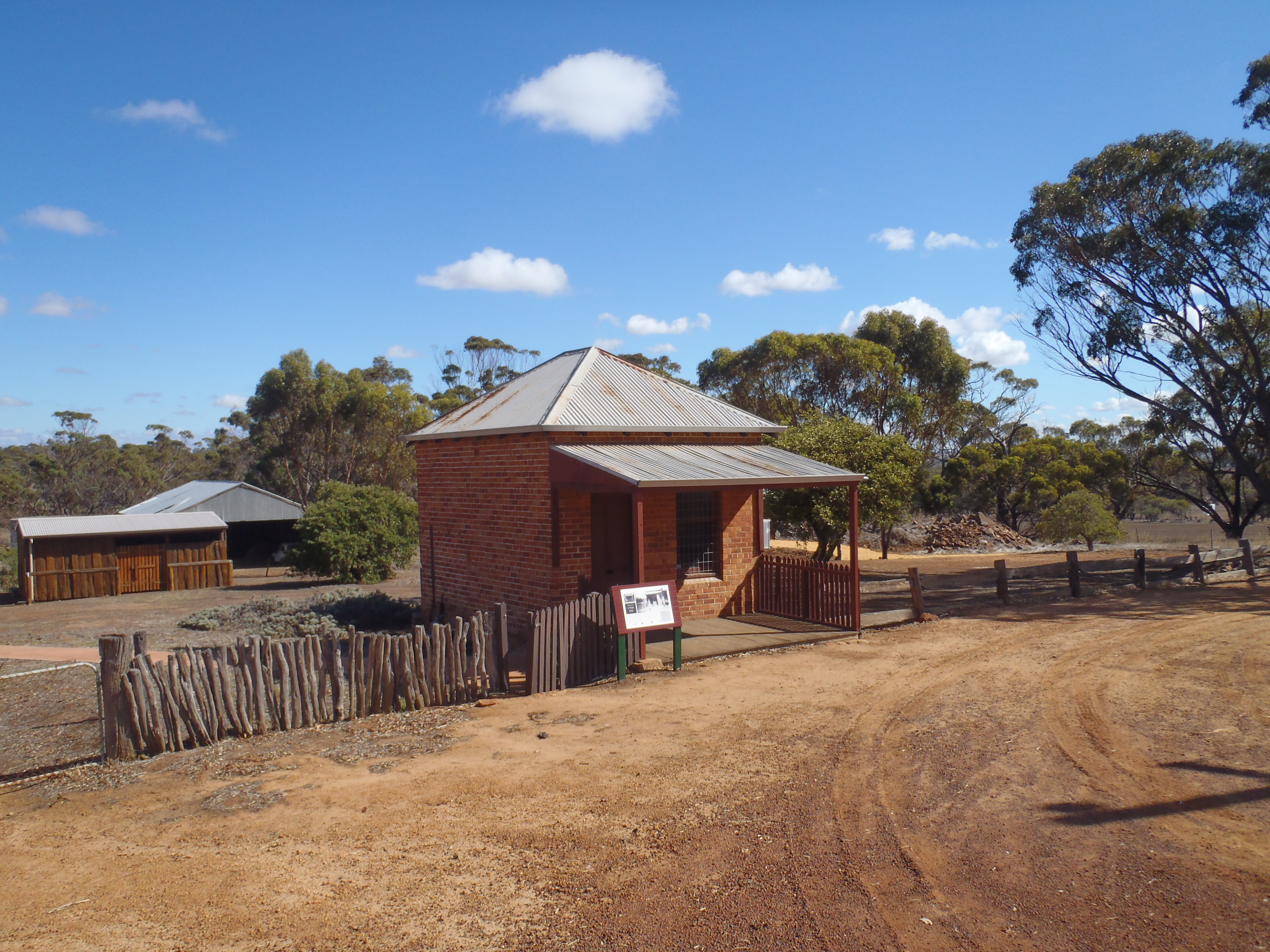
Old Post Office building

Arthur River mainly serves as a fuel stop for travellers, with some of the historic buildings open to tourists.

The Arthur Wool Shed Group, with shearing shed, shearers' quarters, sheep dip and concrete cricket pitch, is one of the most prominent buildings in the town. It was first established in 1910 and opened as a one-stop-shop for community shearers in the 1950s. It was extensively restored in the three years to 2002, at which point the complex was heritage listed by the Heritage Council of WA.
