= Darkan, Western Australia =

Town in the Wheatbelt region of Western Australia

Darkan
- Town
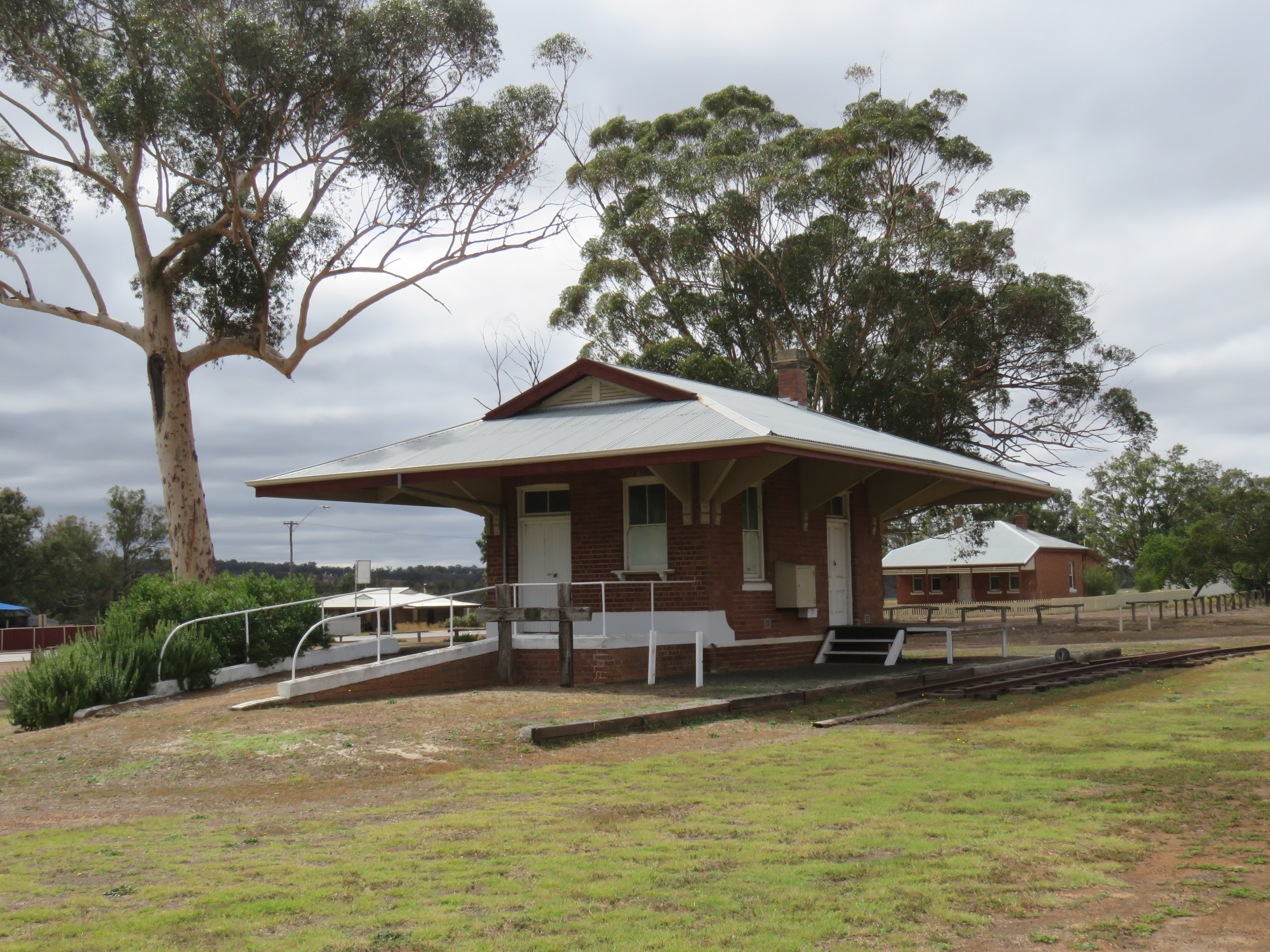
- The heritage listed former railway station in Darkan in 2021

- Interactive map of Darkan
- Coordinates: 33.34°S 116.74°E
- Country: Australia
- State: Western Australia
- LGA: Shire of West Arthur
- Location: 202 km (126 mi) from Perth; 60 km (37 mi) from Wagin; 60 km (37 mi) from Collie
- Established: 1906

Government
  - State electorate: Roe
  - Federal division: O'Connor

Area
  - Total: 668.2 km^{2} (258.0 sq mi)
- Elevation: 279 m (915 ft)

Population
  - Total: 194 (UCL 2021)
- Postcode: 6392

Darkan is a town in the Wheatbelt region of Western Australia, between Collie and the Albany Highway on the Coalfields Highway. It is also the seat of the Shire of West Arthur. At the 2016 census, Darkan had a population of 403.

== History ==
The area was originally settled by William John Gibbs and his family in the 1860s. Gibbs established a property called "Darkan", using a local Aboriginal name which means Black Rock. The townsite developed when the Collie to Narrogin railway line was built, and in 1906, the townsite was gazetted. The town grew quickly thereafter, with a Road Board being established and numerous shops and services being established in the following years. The railway closed in the early 1990s, but the surrounding productive wool growing and mixed farming area along with tourism have ensured the town's survival.

In 1928 a 12-year-old girl Ivy Lewis was murdered by John Milner, who was later hanged for his crime.

== Present day ==
Darkan is the social and political centre in the Shire of West Arthur. The town has a roadhouse, supermarket, telecentre, golf course, shire hall, hotel, synthetic tennis courts, basketball courts, primary school and a skatepark. A more recent addition is "The Shed", a workshop mainly for the town's retirees that consists of a woodworking and a metal working area for the construction of numerous personal projects. A heritage trail (the Road Board Office, Shire Office and Pioneer Hall (1911)) has been established in the town.

The town is surrounded by a fertile (lateritic/alluvial soils), high rainfall (approx 650mm per year) wheat/sheep area that makes use of a small range of services in the town and the CBH Group grain storage bin about 3 km to the east. 10 km to the west is Six Mile Cottage, a very small two-room slab house built by a sleeper cutter for the railway in the early 1900s, and jarrah, flood gum and wandoo bushland reserves, filled with wildflowers in spring, are a short drive away.
