= Bowelling, Western Australia =

Locality and former railway station in Western Australia

Bowelling
- Town
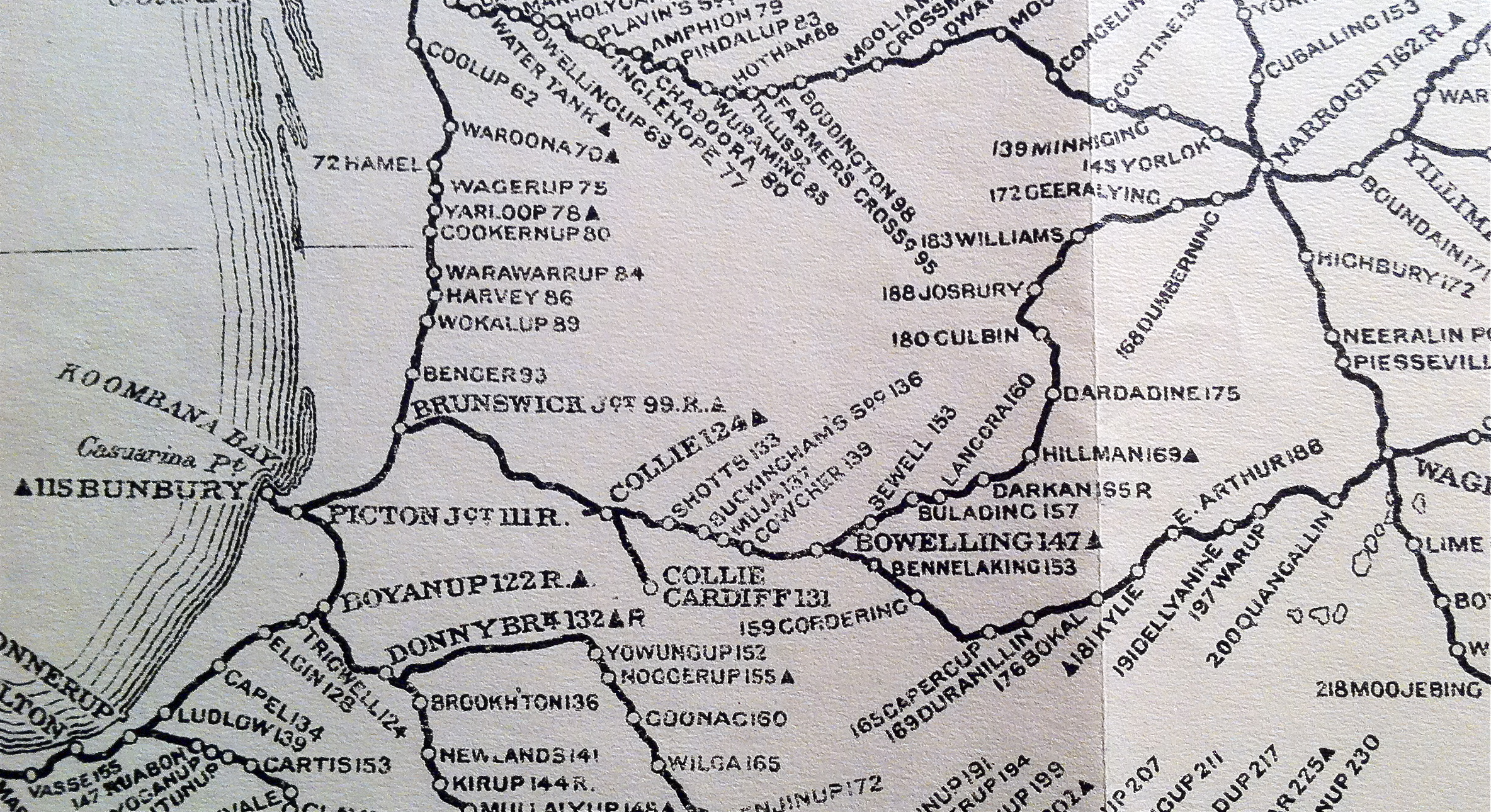
- Bowelling is in the centre of the photograph (the number 147 is the miles from Perth)

- Coordinates: 33.4218°S 116.4878°E
- Country: Australia
- State: Western Australia
- LGA(s): Shire of West Arthur

Government
  - State electorate(s): Roe
  - Federal division(s): O'Connor

Area
  - Total: 699.6 km^{2} (270.1 sq mi)

Population
  - Total(s): 84 (SAL 2021)
- Postcode: 6225

Bowelling is the site of a former railway station in the Wheatbelt region of Western Australia, and is now a locality in the Shire of West Arthur.

It was a junction of the Narrogin to Collie (usually known as Bowelling to Narrogin) and the Wagin to Collie (usually known as Bowelling to Wagin) railway lines.

Narrogin and Wagin were the locations of junctions on the Great Southern Railway, while the railway to Collie connected with the South Western Railway at Brunswick Junction.

The branch lines were regularly reviewed as to their viability in the 1980s by Westrail management, and also by the Transport Commission.
