= Shire of West Arthur =

Local government area in Western Australia

Coordinates: 33°20′17″S 116°44′35″E

- Local government area
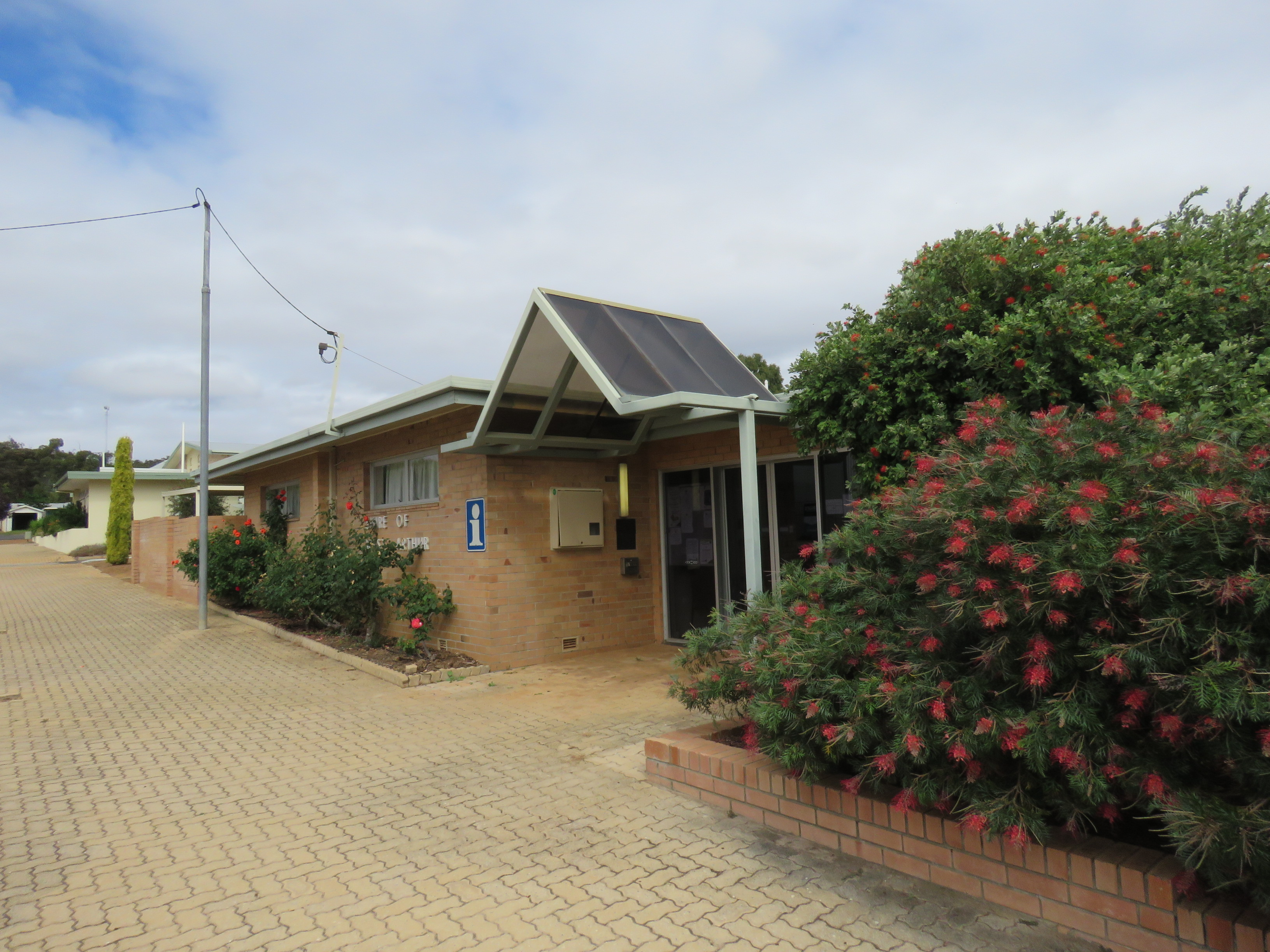
- Shire of West Arthur offices

- Interactive map of Shire of West Arthur
- Country: Australia
- State: Western Australia
- Region: Wheatbelt
- Established: 1896
- Council seat: Darkan

Government
  - Shire President: Karen Harrington
  - State electorate: Roe
  - Federal division: O'Connor

Area
  - Total: 2,834.2 km^{2} (1,094.3 sq mi)

Population
  - Total: 773 (LGA 2021)
- Website: Shire of West Arthur
LGAs around Shire of West Arthur
Collie	Williams	Narrogin
Collie	Shire of West Arthur	Wagin
Boyup Brook	Kojonup	Woodanilling

The Shire of West Arthur is a local government area in the Wheatbelt region of Western Australia, generally to the west of Albany Highway about 200 kilometres (124 mi) south-east of Perth, the state capital. The Shire covers an area of 2,834 square kilometres (1,094 sq mi) and its seat of government is the town of Darkan. Industries within the Shire, worth approximately $45 million per year to the State's economy, are dominated by wool and sheep, and also include timber, grain, forestry, beef, pigs, cattle hide tanning, engineering and earthmoving.

== History ==
The West Arthur Road District was created on 10 January 1896. On 1 July 1961, it became the Shire of West Arthur under the Local Government Act 1960, which reformed all remaining road districts into shires. The name relates to its position with respect to the former Arthur Road District, which was renamed to Wagin in 1905.

== Wards ==
The ward system was discontinued on 20 October 2007 and all nine councillors represent the entire shire.

Previously, the shire was divided into four wards:

- North West (three councillors)
- North East (two councillors)
- South East (two councillors)
- South West (two councillors)

== Towns and localities ==
The towns and localities of the Shire of West Arthur with population and size figures based on the most recent Australian census:

Locality	Population	Area	Map
Arthur River	66 (SAL 2021)	476.9 km^{2} (184.1 sq mi)	
Bokal	42 (SAL 2021)	211.3 km^{2} (81.6 sq mi)	
Bowelling	84 (SAL 2021)	699.6 km^{2} (270.1 sq mi)	
Darkan	371 (SAL 2021)	668.2 km^{2} (258.0 sq mi)	
Duranillin	53 (SAL 2021)	172.7 km^{2} (66.7 sq mi)	
Mokup	62 (SAL 2021)	282 km^{2} (109 sq mi)	
Moodiarrup	63 (SAL 2021)	156.4 km^{2} (60.4 sq mi)	
Trigwell	31 (SAL 2021)	162.9 km^{2} (62.9 sq mi)	

== Former towns ==
- Boolading

== Population ==
Historical population

Year	Pop.	±% p.a.
1911	674	—
1921	624	−0.77%
1933	1,047	+4.41%
1947	876	−1.27%
1954	1,295	+5.74%
1961	1,398	+1.10%
1966	1,427	+0.41%
1971	1,303	−1.80%
1976	1,293	−0.15%

Year	Pop.	±% p.a.
1981	1,288	−0.08%
1986	1,118	−2.79%
1991	973	−2.74%
1996	985	+0.25%
2001	863	−2.61%
2006	858	−0.12%
2011	868	+0.23%
2016	809	−1.40%
2021	773	−0.91%

== Heritage-listed places ==
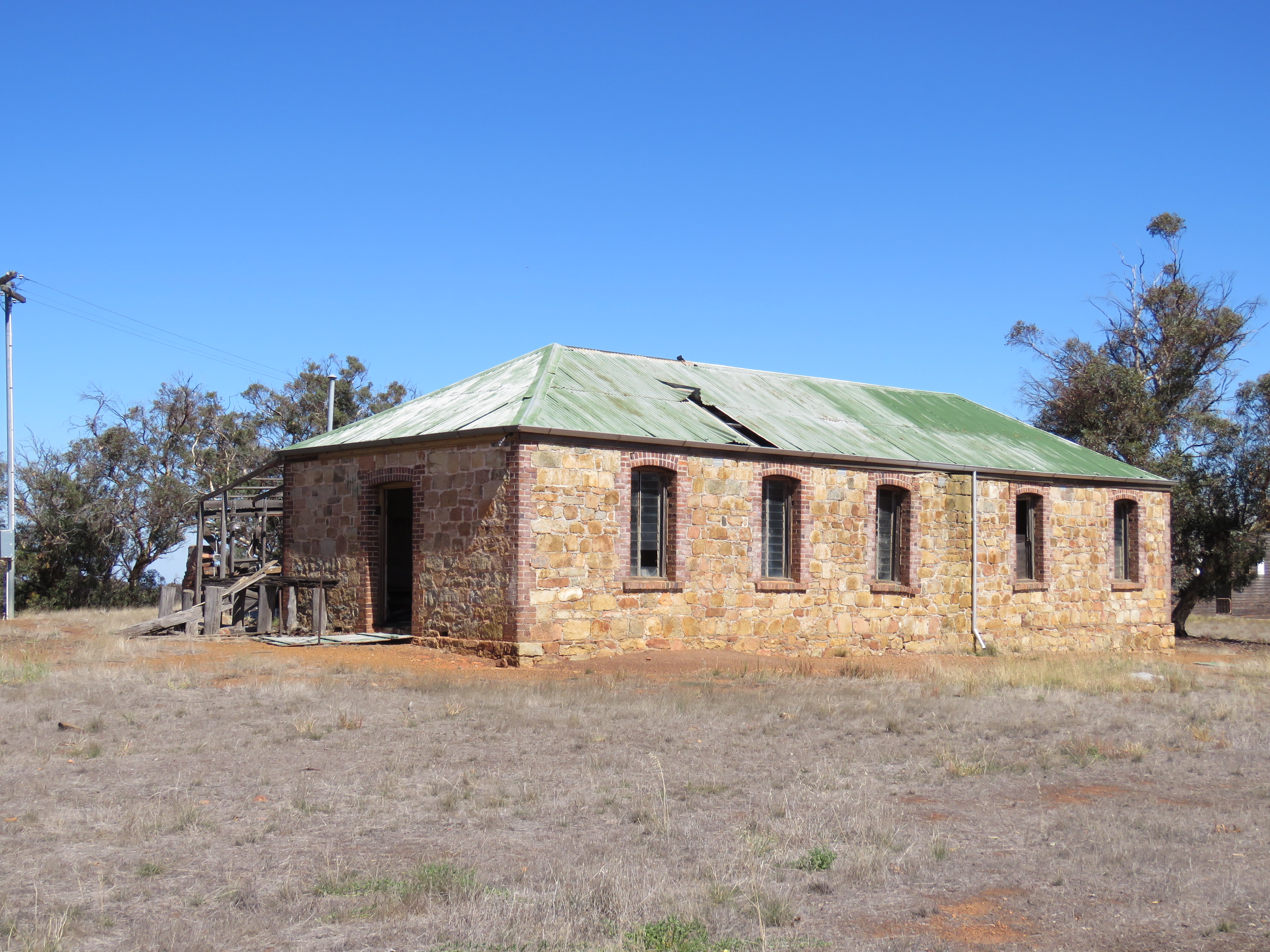
The state heritage listed Old Tillellan Shearing Quarters at Arthur River in 2021

As of 2023, 60 places are heritage-listed in the Shire of West Arthur, of which three are on the State Register of Heritage Places.
