= Wagin, Western Australia =

Town in the Wheatbelt region of Western Australia

Wagin
- Town
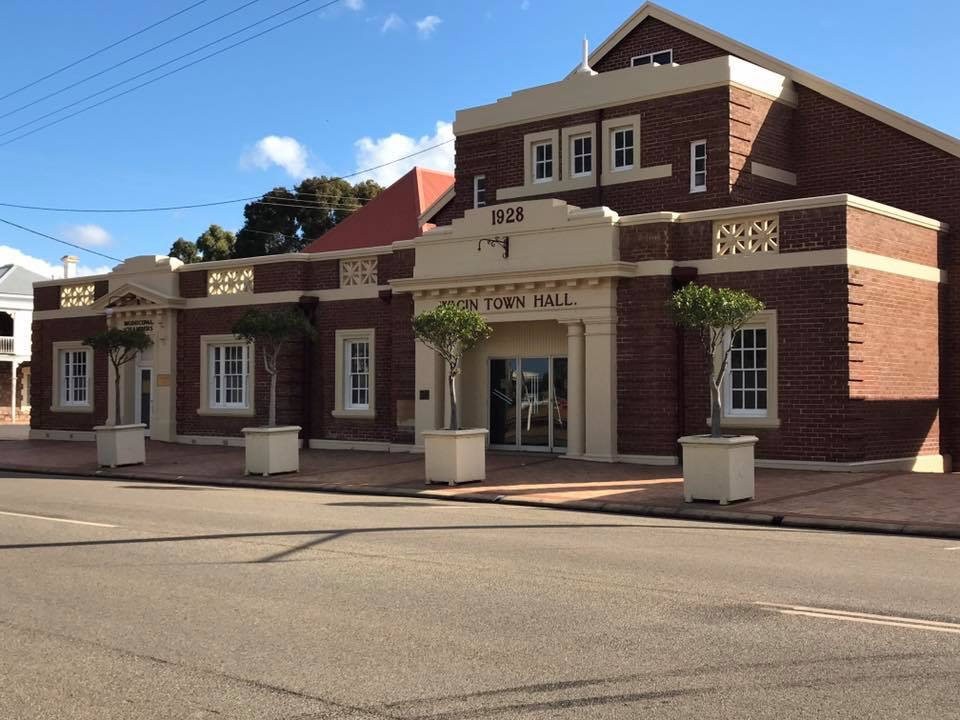
- Wagin Town Hall

- Interactive map of Wagin
- Coordinates: 33°19′00″S 117°21′00″E
- Country: Australia
- State: Western Australia
- Region: Wheatbelt
- LGA: Shire of Wagin
- Location: 228 km (142 mi) from Perth; 50 km (31 mi) from Narrogin; 53 km (33 mi) from Katanning
- Established: 1890s

Government
  - State electorate: Roe
  - Federal division: O'Connor

Area
  - Total: 251.1 km^{2} (97.0 sq mi)
- Elevation: 303 m (994 ft)

Population
  - Total: 1,311 (UCL 2021)
- Postcode: 6315
- Mean max temp: 22.8 °C (73.0 °F)
- Mean min temp: 9.7 °C (49.5 °F)
- Annual rainfall: 436.1 mm (17.17 in)

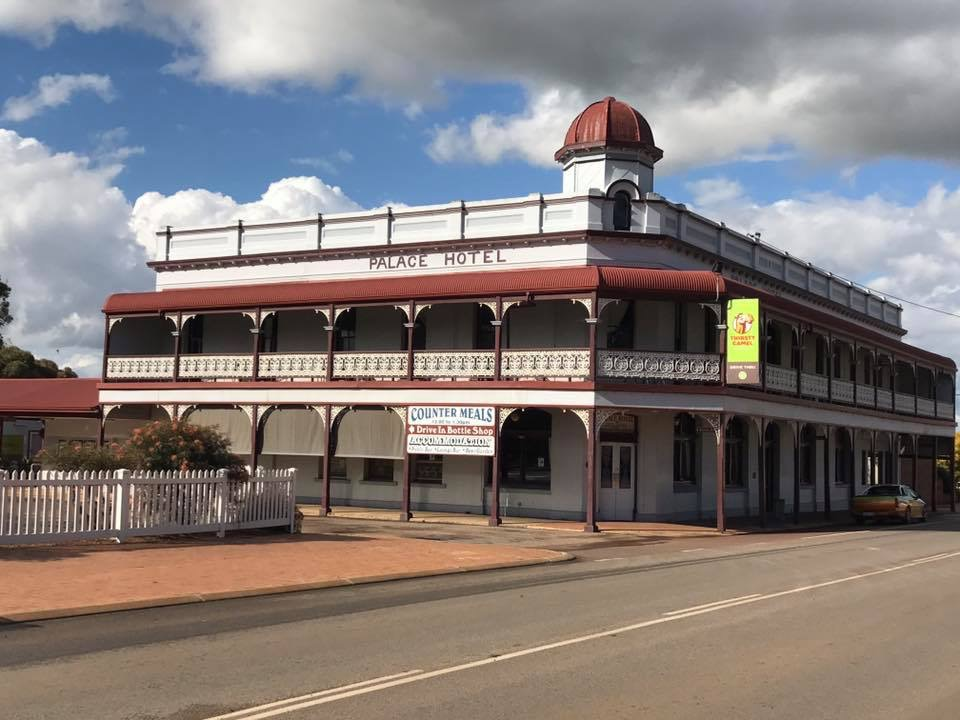
Palace Hotel in Wagin

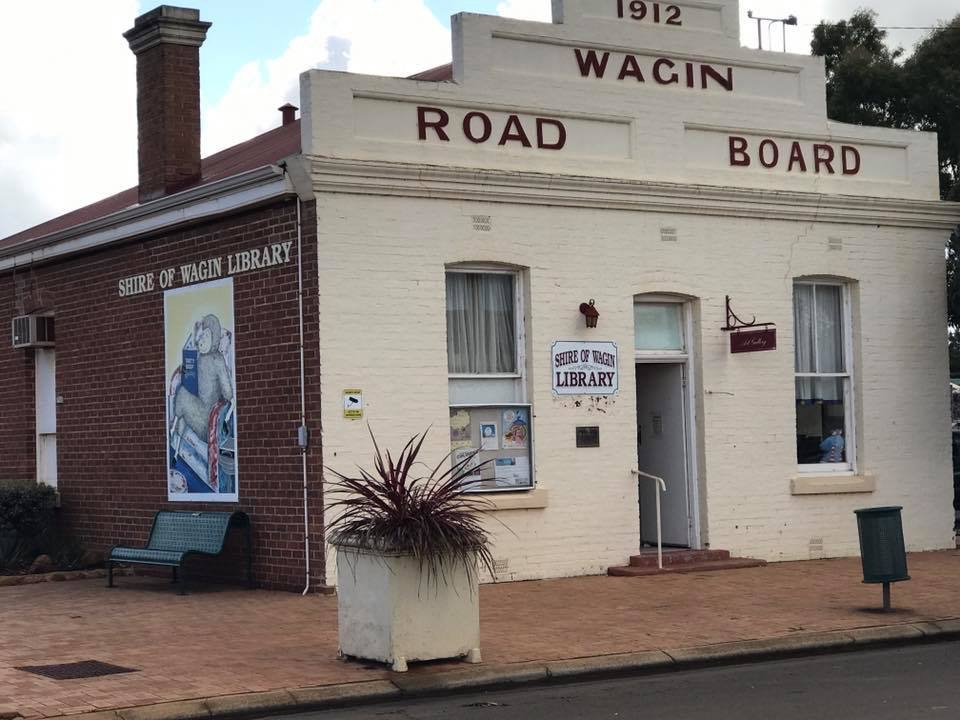
Wagin library 2017

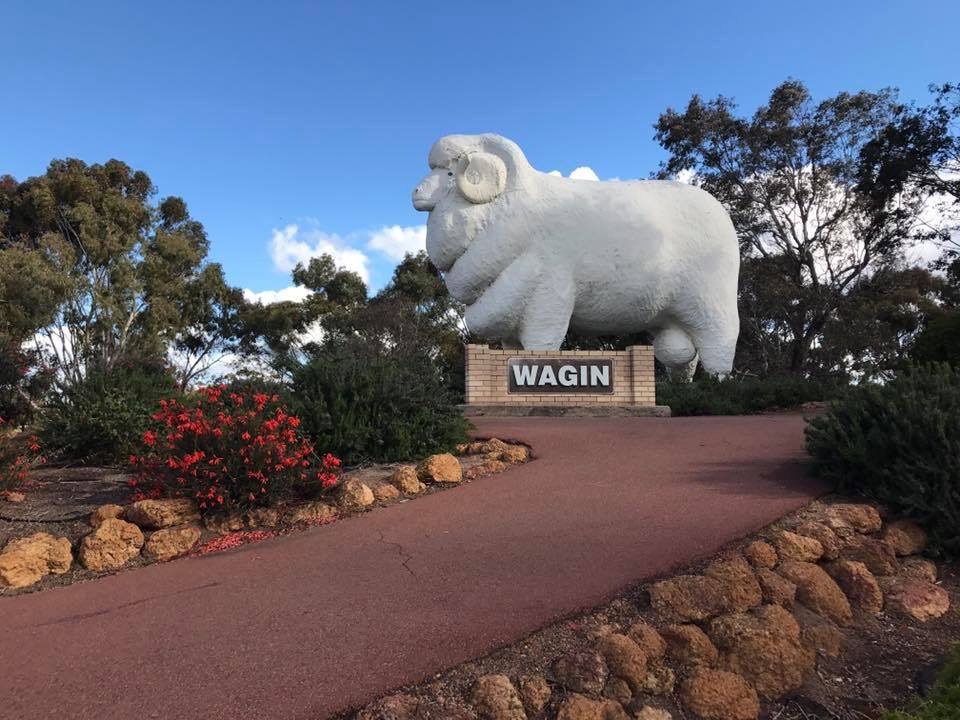
Big Ram sculpture

Wagin /ˈweɪdʒɪn/ is a town and shire in the Wheatbelt region of Western Australia, approximately 225 km (140 mi) south-east of Perth on the Great Southern Highway between Narrogin and Katanning. It is also on State Route 107. The main industries are wheat and sheep farming.

== History ==
The name of the town is derived from Wagin Lake, a usually dry salt lake south of the town. The lake's name is of Noongar origin, and was first recorded by a surveyor in 1869–72. It means "place of emus", or "site of the foot tracks from when the emu sat down".

The first European explorer through the area was John Septimus Roe, the Surveyor General of Western Australia, in 1835 en route to Albany from Perth. Between 1835 and 1889 a few settlers eked a simple living by cutting sandalwood and shepherding small flocks of sheep. Land was granted to pastoralists in the Wagin area from the late 1870s.

The town itself came into existence after the construction of the Great Southern Railway, which was completed in 1889, with the town originally called Wagin Lake.

The first post office and telegraph building, designed by George Temple-Poole, was completed in 1893. The building was replaced by the current building in 1912. The building was designed by Hillson Beasley and built at a cost of £2,596; the old building was converted to living quarters.

The local Agricultural Hall was built by 1896 and opened 1 December the same year. In 1898 Wagin was proclaimed a town with the word Lake dropped. A further railway connection with the Collie to Narrogin line at Bowelling, the Wagin to Bowelling railway line, was made on 10 December 1918.

In early 1898 the population of the town was 175: 125 men and 50 women.

Saint George's Anglican church, a stone Federation Gothic style stone building with a tower, was constructed in 1900 on land donated by Frederick Piesse.

The Palace Hotel was built in 1905. The two-storey Federation Filigree style building with large verandahs in located on Trudhoe Street. The original owner was Paddy. B. Durack, who also owned a sizeable property east of Wagin known as Behn Ord. Significant extensions were added to the building in 1911.

The Wagin Road Boards building was built in 1912 at a cost of £400. The building housed the town library for many years before it moved to the former Town Hall in 2023.

Planning for the construction of the current town hall commenced in 1928 with tenders being called for. The estimated cost for the building was £6000. The foundation stone was laid in May of the same year by Sydney Stubbs. The building included a main hall to seat 600 people, a lesser hall to seat 250, library, council chambers, stage, kitchen and dressing rooms, and was completed early in 1929 at a cost of £6500.

In 1934 the town was extensively flooded after the area experienced 5.4 inches (137 mm) of rainfall in a short period of time, the heaviest for 20 years. Water over 1 foot (30 cm) deep flowed through the Town Hall and along business premises and dwellings along Tudor Street. The railway yards were flooded and the railway dam burst under the water pressure.

The Big Ram or Giant Ram, a tourist attraction, was erected in Wetlands Park in 1985. The sculptor was Andrew Hickson, who constructed the ram from fibreglass over a steel frame. The ram stands 9 metres (30 ft) tall, 13 m (43 ft) long and 6 m (20 ft) wide, and weighs 4 tonnes (3.94 long tons; 4.41 short tons). Thousands of tourists visit the park each year to view the ram. The sculpture is the second largest of its kind in the Southern Hemisphere.

Wagin was the closest major town to the Arthur River earthquake swarm recorded during January 2022. The peak of the swarm occurred on 25 January 2022 with a magnitude 4.7/4.8 earthquake, which caused minor damage such as wall cracks to properties in the area.

== Present day ==
Wagin is one of the largest towns in the southern Wheatbelt, and annually hosts the Wagin Woolorama, one of Western Australia's largest agricultural shows. The event held in March each year regularly attracts over 30,000 visitors.

== Notable residents ==
Two sets of three well-known brothers played league football after leaving Wagin: Murray, Harry and Phil Riseborough; and Peter, Phil and Wally Matera.

== Climate ==
Climate data for Wagin, Western Australia (1970–2024)
Month	Jan	Feb	Mar	Apr	May	Jun	Jul	Aug	Sep	Oct	Nov	Dec	Year
Record high °C (°F)	44.0 (111.2)	43.4 (110.1)	40.5 (104.9)	37.1 (98.8)	33.2 (91.8)	24.2 (75.6)	22.7 (72.9)	26.2 (79.2)	31.8 (89.2)	37.0 (98.6)	40.9 (105.6)	43.7 (110.7)	44.0 (111.2)
Mean daily maximum °C (°F)	31.2 (88.2)	30.5 (86.9)	27.7 (81.9)	23.7 (74.7)	19.5 (67.1)	16.4 (61.5)	15.4 (59.7)	16.1 (61.0)	18.4 (65.1)	22.1 (71.8)	25.9 (78.6)	29.4 (84.9)	23.0 (73.5)
Mean daily minimum °C (°F)	14.6 (58.3)	14.9 (58.8)	13.5 (56.3)	10.8 (51.4)	8.0 (46.4)	6.3 (43.3)	5.7 (42.3)	5.7 (42.3)	6.3 (43.3)	7.9 (46.2)	10.8 (51.4)	13.0 (55.4)	9.8 (49.6)
Record low °C (°F)	4.2 (39.6)	4.6 (40.3)	2.4 (36.3)	0.1 (32.2)	−0.7 (30.7)	−2.2 (28.0)	−3.0 (26.6)	−1.3 (29.7)	−1.5 (29.3)	−0.5 (31.1)	0.0 (32.0)	2.4 (36.3)	−3.0 (26.6)
Average precipitation mm (inches)	12.5 (0.49)	16.1 (0.63)	20.6 (0.81)	28.2 (1.11)	53.4 (2.10)	70.4 (2.77)	70.0 (2.76)	56.8 (2.24)	40.9 (1.61)	29.0 (1.14)	18.0 (0.71)	13.0 (0.51)	428.6 (16.87)
Average rainy days	1.5	1.6	2.3	3.6	6.6	8.8	9.5	8.5	6.7	4.8	2.9	1.6	58.4
Source: Australian Bureau of Meteorology
