= Vehicle registration plates of the Cocos (Keeling) Islands =

Cocos (Keeling) Islands vehicle license plates

Vehicle registration plates of the Cocos (Keeling) Islands began issuing in 1969. Current plates are Australian standard 372 mm × 134 mm (14.6 in × 5.3 in), and the current series started in 2000.

== Vehicle types ==
Vehicle types
Type	Example	Meaning
General issue		

== See also ==
- Vehicle registration plates of Christmas Island
