= Vehicle registration plates of Tonga =

Tonga
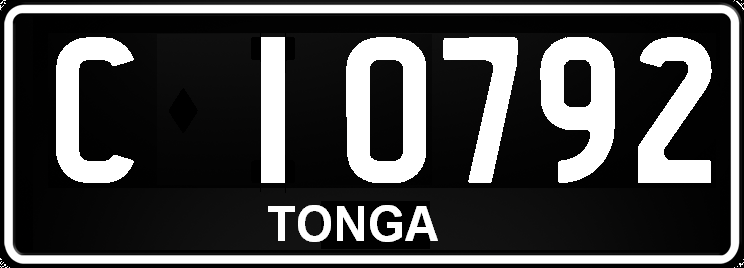
- Country: Tonga
- Country code: TO

Current series
- Slogan: None
- Size: 372 mm × 134 mm 14.6 in × 5.3 in
- Serial format: C 12345

History
- First issued: 1967; 59 years ago

Tonga requires its residents to register their motor vehicles and display vehicle registration plates. Current plates are Australian standard 372 mm × 134 mm (14.6 in × 5.3 in), colored white on black. It is the duty of the owner to get the license plate made.

== Current plate format ==
The current format uses a letter followed by 1-5 digits. The letter used denotes the type of vehicle.

Image	First issued	Design	Serial format	Serials issued	Notes
	1967	White on black	A 123		
		White on black	A 12345		

=== Vehicle types ===
Letter	Type of the vehicle
В	Buses
С	Private cars
G	Trailers
H	Vehicles carrying heavy cargo
J	Vehicles carrying cargo
L	Vehicles carrying light cargo
МС	Motorcycles
P	State vehicles
R	Rental vehicles
T	Taxis
V	Three-wheeled vehicles

== Diplomatic license plates ==
License plates of diplomatic missions consist of a letter prefix of the name of the country and a digital number. The front license plates have a white background, the rear ones have a yellow background, and the font is black in both cases.

Prefix	Diplomatic mission
AUST	Australia
EEC	European Union
NZ	New Zealand
UK	United Kingdom
USA	United States

== Other license plates ==
The King's license plate has either the letters HM or a crown symbol; The Queen's license plate has the letters Q1. The Prime Minister's license plate has the letters PM and two digits.
