= Vehicle registration plates of Fiji =

Fiji
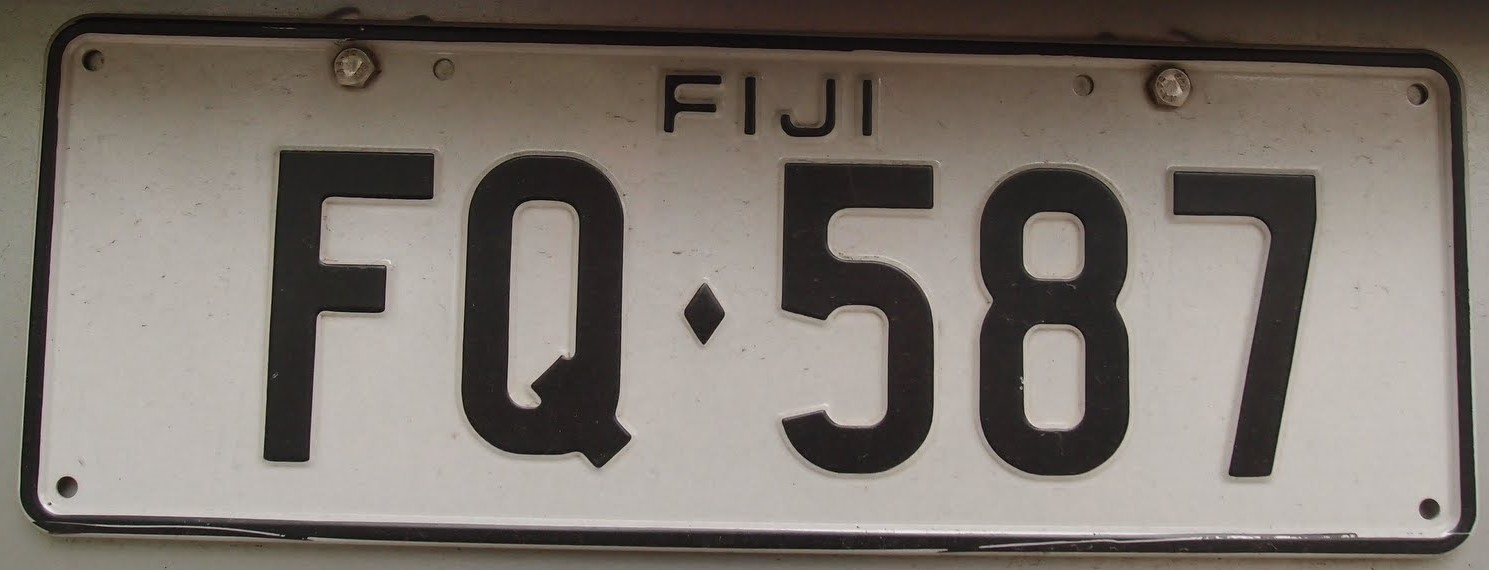
- Country: Fiji
- Country code: FJI

Current series
- Slogan: None
- Size: 372 mm × 134 mm 14.6 in × 5.3 in
- Serial format: AB 123

Fiji requires its residents to register their motor vehicles and display vehicle registration plates. Current plates are issued by the Land Transport Authority (LTA) and are Australian standard 372 mm × 134 mm (14.6 in × 5.3 in), and use Australian stamping dies. Motor vehicle registration numbers stay with the vehicle for its life, and damaged registration plates are often remade in a newer style. LTA presses Fiji registration plates using aluminium blanks (reflective background, border, mounting holes and FIJI insert) manufactured in Australia.

General Issue	First issued	Colours	Serial format and notes
	1976	Black on reflective white	AA-001 to CC-999, CE-001 to CO-999; Steel base, CP-001 to CZ-999; Steel base with slightly smaller letters and numbers, DA-001 to KZ-999, MA-001 to MZ-999, OA-001 onwards reaching OK-999 by mid 2025; Aluminium base with "FIJI" insert. Older registrations are often made in the newer style.
Privately imported motor vehicles	First issued	Colours	Serial format and notes
	1976	Black on reflective white	D-0001 o E-9999.No longer issued, but still used. Older registrations are often made in the newer style.
Motorcycle	First issued	Colours	Serial format and notes
	1976	Black on white (001-A to 499-A). Black on reflective white (500-A onwards)	001-A onwards, reaching 999H by 2025. Plates measure 184mm x 95mm. 001-A to 999-E feature a small diamond, omitted from 001F onwards. From 001F, plate characters are centred horizontally on the plate, and from 001H plate characters are centred horizontally and vertically on the plate. Plates were issued in pairs up to 999-E.
Government Vehicle	First issued	Colours	Serial format and notes
	1976	White on blue, formerly blue on reflective white.	GI-001 onwards, reaching GU-001 by 2025.
