= Vehicle registration plates of Vanuatu =

Vanuatu
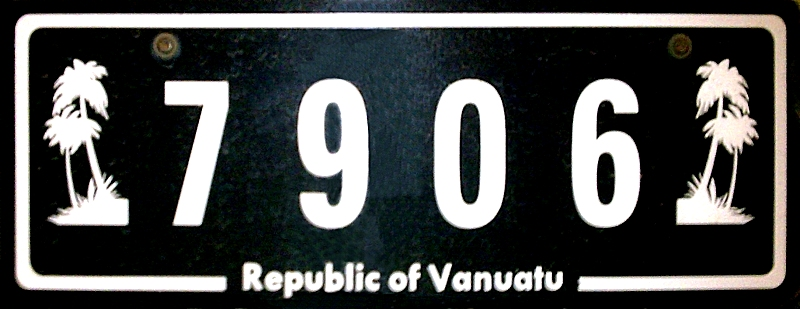
- Country: Vanuatu
- Country code: None

Current series
- Slogan: None
- Size: 372 mm × 134 mm 14.6 in × 5.3 in
- Serial format: ABCD 1

Vanuatu requires its residents to register their motor vehicles and display vehicle registration plates. Current plates are Australian standard 372 mm × 134 mm (14.6 in × 5.3 in), colored white on black. It is the duty of the owner to get the license plate made.

Image	First issued	Design	Slogan	Serial format	Serials issued	Notes
		White on black	Republic of Vanuatu	12345		
		White on black, with palm trees to the side of the numbers	Republic of Vanuatu	1234		
		Red on green	None	ABCD 1		Diplomatic
