= Vehicle registration plates of Papua New Guinea =

Motor vehicles registration, PNG

Papua New Guinea
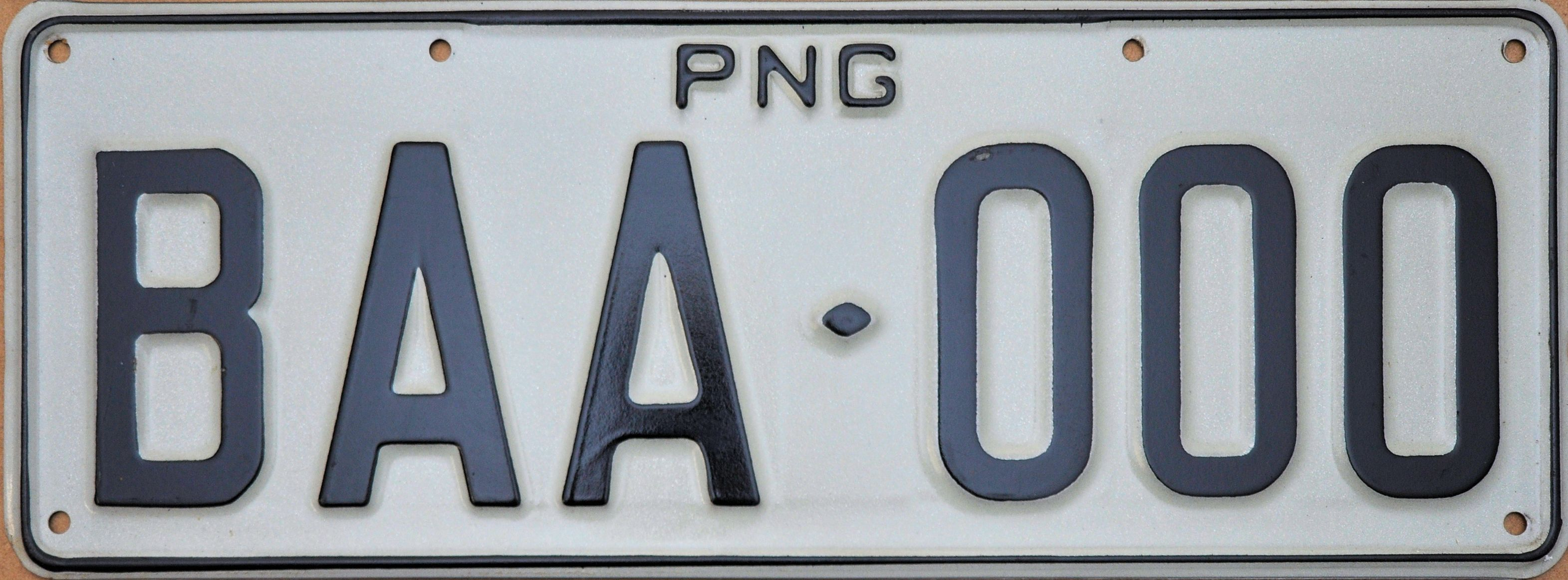
- Regular legal standard number plate from PNG.
- Country: Papua New Guinea
- Country code: PNG

Current series
- Size: 372 mm × 134 mm 14.6 in × 5.3 in
- Serial format: ABC 123
- Colour (front): Black on white
- Colour (rear): Black on white

Papua New Guinea (Papua Niugini in Tok Pisin) requires its residents to register their motor vehicles and display vehicle registration plates. Motor vehicle registration is the responsibility of Motor Vehicle Insurance Limited (MVIL). Current plates are in two styles; Australian standard 372 mm × 134 mm, and use Australian stamping dies, and what is commonly referred to as "Euro Flag" style. The latter has the flag of Papua New Guinea and often a provincial flag from Morobe or Madang Province on the left. The stamping dies are German FE style. Since the mid-1990s, plates have been issued with the first letter identifying the province of issue. As of 2025, most private and commercial motor vehicles use standard white plates with black lettering. Special number plates are issued to Consular staff, Diplomatic staff, Government owned vehicles, motorcycles, public motor vehicles (buses), taxis, trailers and to those engaged in selling or repairing vehicles. Especially in the provincial areas, many vehicles feature either just one plate, or a home-made alternative to replace a missing officially issued plate.

== History ==
From 1884 to 1914, the area known today as New Guinea was a German protectorate called German New Guinea (Deutsch Neuguinea). Motor vehicles in use there displayed the German registration plates of the era. From 1914 to 1949, Papua New Guinea was divided into two territories; The Territory of Papua and The Territory of New Guinea. Plates with TP and TNG respectively were used. Following the administrative union of the two territories in 1949, plates with TP&NG were introduced. Following the Independence from Australia in 1973, modified plates were introduced. In 1975, a series of new plates were introduced. Older plates were exchanged upon renewal of vehicle registration in 1975–1976.

Current registration plates in use.

General issue type. Introduced in 1975, beginning at AAA-000. Manufacturing variations exist. AAA-000 to ACR-999 were manufactured by Altona Industries and made of steel. ACS-000 to AEC-999 were manufactured by Page Industries, used large dies and made of steel. AED-000 to AFA-999, and AFF-000 to AHA-999 were manufactured by Page Industries, used smaller dies and made of steel. AFB-000 to AFE-999 were manufactured by Huon Industries PNG and made of aluminium.		In about 1993, Papua New Guinea began using a letter system to denote the province of registration. General issue type issued in the National Capital District (NCD), as denoted by the B prefix. Manufacturing variations exist. BAA-000 to BAK-000 were manufactured by Altona Industries and made of steel. BAL-000 onwards were made of aluminium.	General issue type from each Province. B=National Capital District (Port Moresby). C=Central Pr. D=Western (Fly) Province. E=Eastern Highlands Province F=Milne Bay Province G=Gulf Province H=Highlands Province I=Chimbu/Simbu Province J=Manus Island
General issue type from each Province. JWK=Jiwaka Province K=West New Britain L=Morobe Province. M=Madang N=New Ireland Province O=Oro Province P=Reserved for Provincial Government vehicles. Q=Not issued. R=East New Britain Province. S=Southern Highlands Province T=Hela Province. U=Autonomous Region Of Bouganville V=West Sepik/Sanduan W=Wewak Province.	Papua New Guinea registration plates from various provinces.	General issue type issued in the Euro Flag style. These are predominantly issued in Morobe and Madang, however examples exist with an A, B, C, H, I, K, and R prefixes. A slight manufacturing variation exists in plates LCD-200 to LCE-999, and feature a smaller square between the letters and numbers.	General issue motorcycle registration plate. Introduced in 1975, beginning at AA-000. Early plates were made of steel, and changed to aluminium at AR-000. In about 2023, Morobe Province introduced Euro Flag style plates. Although all motorcycle plates are national issues, a sample plate exists (CA-003) that suggests provincial issues were planned for introduction.
Trailer registration plates. Introduced in 1993, manufacturing variations exist. TR-0001 to TR-0449; Page Industries. TR-0500 to TR-0999, plus TR-3200 to (?); Altona Industries. TR-1000 onwards; Licensys. Sporadic issues exist in the Euro Flag design.		Taxi registration plate. these commence in 1975 at T-0000. After T-9999 was issued, T-00000 was released. Various manufacturing styles exist. From T-0000 to T-1499; Manufactured by Altona with large dies.Made of steel. T-1500 to T-4499; Manufactured by Page Industries with small dies. Made of steel. T-4500 to T-6999; Manufactured by Licensys. Horizontal diamond, made of aluminium. T-7000 to T-9999; Manufactured by Licensys. Vertical diamond, made of aluminium. T-00000 onwards reaching T-04000 by July 2026. Manufactured by Licensys. Vertical diamond, made of aluminium.	Taxi registration plates in the Euro Flag style, issued by Morobe Land Transport. These commenced at T-0000 to about T-0359. These were followed by T-02250 onwards. At least five sets of plates (T-0210 to T-0214) were erroneously made using the letter O instead of the number 0 (zero).
Public Motor Vehicle (PMV) registration plates and introduced in 1975. Blue plates denote no set route. Manufactured in various styles. Altona: P-0000 to P-5999. None issued in the P-3000 to P-4999 range. Page: P-6000 to P-8999 Houn: P-9000 to P9620 at least. P-000M to P-999P; Page P-000Q to P-999T: Altona P-000U to P-349U; Licensys. One vertical diamond P-350-U to P-999-U; Licensys. Two Horizontal diamonds P-000V to P-999V; Page Industries. P-000-W to P-999-Z; Licensys. P-0000A onwards reaching P-0000L by 2023. From P-0000A to P-0999I, series ran with a lead zero (so after P-0999A is P-0000B). From P-0000J onwards serials rolled over to the likes of P-1000J after P-0999J etc. Vertical diamonds commence at P-7000K. Euro Flag style plates P-0800E in 2009 to P-0999E, P-0900G to P-0999G, P4500-I to P4899-I, P-0450J to P-0639J, P-0700J to P-0999J, P-5000J to P-5599J, P-6100J to P-6299J, P-6500J to P-6799J, P-0100K to P-0199K, P-0650K to P-0659K, P-3450K to P-3499K, P-6170K to P-6179K, P-9000K to P-9699K. L Batches are made based on numbers allocated by MVIL in Port Moresby. As a result, batch runs can be small and sporadic. Some plate numbers made by Licensys are remade in the flag style on request as replacement plates. Note that I suffix plates have the square separator just before the last letter (P4500-I instead of P-4500I).		Public Motor Vehicle (PMV) registration plate. Orange plates are used on buses assigned to set routes. Manufacturing variations exist. P-0001 to P-1499; Page Industries with large dies. P-000A to P-999C; Page Industries with small dies, including P-011C manufactured incorrectly with a space after the letter C. P-000D onwards, reaching P-0600E by late 2024 plus a limited number of remakes; Licensys Industries, and made from aluminium.	Public Motor Vehicle (PMV) registration plate in the Euro Flag style, issued in Lae, Morobe Province. Orange plates are used on buses assigned to set routes. Numbers issued; P-0001J onwards and consisting of sporadic numbers with a J and K suffix;
Hire Vehicle registration plate. Issued to vehicles where a driver is included in the vehicle hire. Manufaacturing varieties exist. H-0001 to -0299 manufactured by Page Industries. H-0300 to H-1499 (?) manufactured by Altona Industries. H-2000 onwards manufactured by Licensys, with a variety having a gap between the H and first digit. Euro Flag versions exist in the H-01xx, H-02xx, H-5300 to H-5499 blocks.		The Governor-General's official car has a plate with an embossed crown (St. Edward's Crown) on a red background. No plates bearing letters or numbers are included on this vehicle. Prime Minister and Deputy Prime Minister's official vehicle plates.	Red Z plates are issued to vehicle owned by the Papua New Guinea Government. The second letter denotes the department. ZA=CASA PNG ZB=PNG Broadcasting ZCU=PNG University. ZD=PNGDF EC, ZE=PNG Power (no longer issued). ZG=various departments including health services, police and PNG Fire Service. ZH, ZJ=Unknown. ZMS=Mineral Resources. ZNC, ZNP=Local Police. ZPD, ZPF=PNG Police (RPNGC). ZPL=PNG Power ZPT=PNG Post ZSA=Department of Supply. ZWB, ZWP=Unknown.
Plates with a red Z and in the range ZPD-000 to ZPD-999 and ZPF-000 to ZPF-999 are issued to police vehicles of the Royal Papua New Guinea Constabulary.		Red Z plates are issued to motorcycles owned by the Papua New Guinea Government. Originally made from steel, and commencing at ZA-000 in 1975. In late 2024, ZA-000 to ZA-015 were issued to Traffic Police motorcycles in Port Moresby. These newer plates were made of pressed aluminium.	Plates with a red Z and in the range ZP-000 to at least ZP-020 are issued to motorcycles of the Royal Papua New Guinea Constabulary. These were introduced in 2017.
Provincial Government vehicles are issued with "Red P" style plates. The initial batch had PA followed by three digits. Here, the smaller plate was used on motorcycles. Various manufacturing varieties exist. PAA-000 to PAC-999 were manufactured by Page Industries. PAD-000 to PAJ-999 were manufactured by Licensys and made of aluminium. A small number in the PAE and PAG blocks were manufactured in the Euro Flag style.		Special plates were issued in The Autonomous Region of Bougainville. Manufactured by Pacific Personalised Plates (PPP) The flat screen-printed plates were issued from November 2010 as part of a road safety campaign. The slogan "DRAIV WANTAIM TINGTING" is Tok Pisin for Drive with thought. Numbers issued were ABA-001 to ABA-999, and ABB-002 to ABB-050.	Consular staff are assigned black plates with a CC prefix. These commenced in 1973 with a white plate (example CC-010 shown), followed by flat plates (example CC-030 shown), then black plates made of steel by Page Industries (example CC-196 shown), then aluminium plates manufactured by LicenSys with registration numbers recommencing at CC-000 (example CC-002 shown). Also shown is CC-004, a hand-made replacement. Diplomatic plates commenced upon independence in 1975. These are coloured maroon with white writing on a flat plate (example DC-055 shown), followed by embossed plates coloured maroon with grey lettering manufactured by Page Industries (example DC-393 shown), then maroon and white aluminium plates manufactured by LicenSys with registration numbers commencing at DC-800 (example DC-811 and DC-1449 shown).
Trade plates are issued to motor vehicle dealers to use temporarily on unregistered vehicles.		Trade plate in the Euro Flag style.	Personalised Registration plates are available for an extra fee. Initially only three letter-three number (ABC-123) format was allowed, followed by 123-ABC format. Since 2023, any combination of letters and numbers up to six characters are allowed. Plates are generally coloured black writing on a reflective gold background, although plates made in the Euro Flag style may also have a reflective white background.
Special plates were manufactured by Pacific Personalised Plates for the 4th Grassroots Games held in Port Moresby from 17 to 28 November 2009. 88 pairs were issued.		Special plates were manufactured by Pacific Personalised Plates in 2010 to commemorate the 25th Anniversary of Papua New Guinea's independence from Australia in 2000. 1000 pairs were manufactured, but unknown how many were actually issued to motor vehicles.	
General issue type issued in the Territory of Papua. Believed to have been introduced in 1920.		General issue type issued in the Territory of New Guinea. Believed to have been introduced in 1920. Period photos show many were made from kits. These kits consisted of a pre-drilled black painted steel plate with clip on aluminium numbers, consistent with the type of plate kit used in Queensland at the time. Others are of similar style to New South Wales registration plates of the same period.	General issue type used in the Territory of Papua and New Guinea. TP&NG1 to TP&NG82-999. Introduced in 1951. Early plates were made by the issuing authority from kits. From about TP&NG3-000 were in the Australian style. Plates from TP&NG10-000 to TP&NG13-999 featured a black border.
General issue type introduced in 1973 to reflect self governing . Range PNG83-000 to PNG99-999.		General issue motorcycle registration plates from TP&NG. Issued from 1951 to 1973.	General issue motorcycle registration plates from PNG. Introduced in 1973.
Taxi registration plate from TP&NG		Public Motor Vehicle (PMV) registration plate. These were introduced in 1968. Plates from PMV 001 to PMV1999 were manufactured in New Zealand by Precision Industries.	Public Motor Vehicle (PMV) registration plate. Plates from PMV 2000 to PMV2999 were manufactured in Australia by Page Industries.
Public Motor Vehicle (PMV) registration plate introduced in 1973. Plates from PMV 3000 to PMV5199 were issued.		Registration plates from the Administrator and Deputy Administrator of the Territory of Papua New Guinea.	Registration plate used on vehicles belonging to the Administration of the Territory of Papua New Guinea.
Registration plate used on motorcycles belonging to the Administration of the Territory of Papua New Guinea.		Registration plate used on vehicles belonging to the Administration of Papua New Guinea. Introduced in 1973 to reflect self government.	Registration plate used on vehicles belonging to the National Government of Papua New Guinea. Introduced in 1975 to reflect independence from Australia.
Registration plate used motorcycles belonging to the National Government of Papua New Guinea. Introduced in 1975 to reflect independence from Australia.		Various styles of Consular Corps registration plates. CC-033 is a flat, screen printed type.	Diplomatic Corps registration plate. The plate is a flat screen printed type.
Prior to self-government in 1973, nationally owned vehicles were the property of the Commonwealth of Australia. Red Z registration plates with a C OF A insert were used. Some photos indicate that plates in the ZWP block were unique to TP&NG based vehicles.		Trade plates of various styles. The T-203 plate was issued when Papua New Guinea was an Australian territory.	Registration plates used on Papua New Guinea Defence Force vehicles. The lower plate was as used on motorcycles. Introduced in 1975 at number 1-000, and withdrawn by the mid-1980s at 2–999. Motorcycle plates were made with the numbers 001 to 150.
