= Vehicle registration plates of Nauru =

Nauru
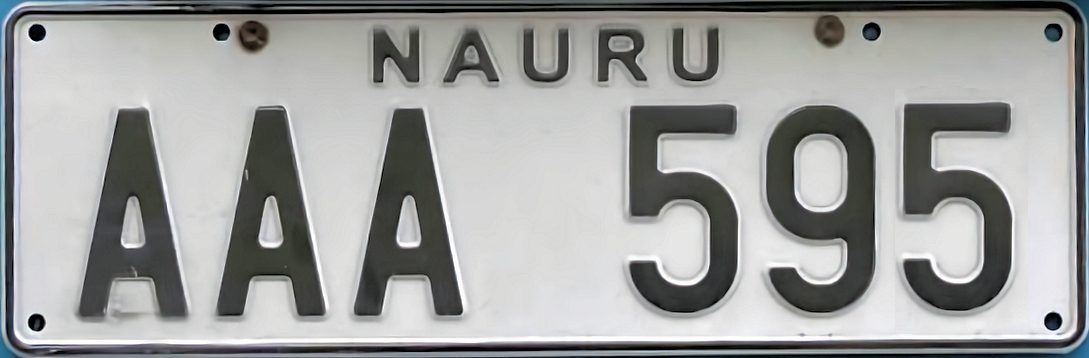
- Country: Nauru
- Country code: NAU

Current series
- Slogan: None
- Size: 372 mm × 134 mm 14.6 in × 5.3 in
- Serial format: AAA 123

Nauru requires its residents to register their motor vehicles and display vehicle registration plates since 1970. Current plates are Australian standard 372 mm × 134 mm (14.6 in × 5.3 in), and use Australian stamping dies.

| Image | Used | Design | Serial format | Serials issued | Notes |
|---|---|---|---|---|---|
| | 1970–1975 | White on black | 1-234 | | |
| | 1975-2015 | Black on white | 1234 | | |
| | 2015–present | Black on white | ABC 123 | | |
