= Vehicle registration plates of the Solomon Islands =

The Solomon Islands
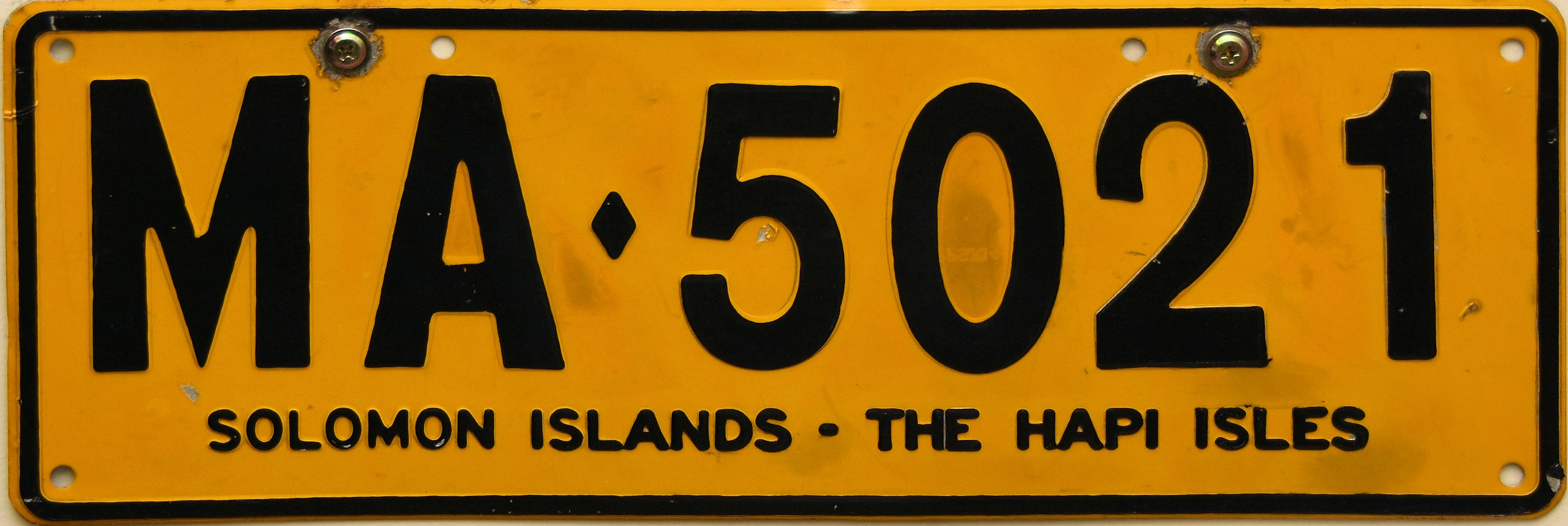
- Current style registration plate from the Solomon Islands.
- Country: Solomon Islands
- Country code: None

Current series
- Slogan: The Hapi Islands
- Size: 152 mm × 305 mm 6.0 in × 12.0 in
- Introduced: 2014; 12 years ago

The Solomon Islands requires its residents to register their motor vehicles and display vehicle registration plates. Until 2014 motorists typically made their own plates, but since 2014 the Solomon Islands Government has issued them. Current plates are Australian standard 372 mm × 134 mm (14.6 in × 5.3 in).

Image	First issued	Serial format	Serials issued
	2014		MA-0000 to MA-9999, then MB-0000 onwards
