= State nicknames =

State nicknames may refer to:

- List of U.S. state and territory nicknames
- Vehicle registration plates of Australia
