= Vehicle registration plates of Tuvalu =

Tuvalu
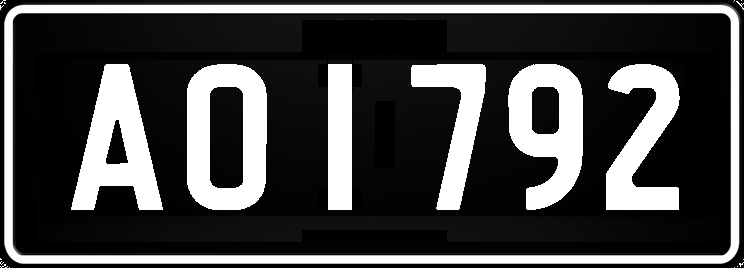
- Regular legal standard number plate from Tuvalu.
- Country: Tuvalu
- Country code: None

Current series
- Slogan: None
- Size: 372 mm × 134 mm 14.6 in × 5.3 in
- Serial format: AB1234
- Colour (front): White on black
- Colour (rear): White on black

Tuvalu requires its residents to register their motor vehicles and display vehicle registration plates. Current plates are Australian standard 372 mm × 134 mm (14.6 in × 5.3 in), colored white on black. It is the duty of the owner to get the license plate made.

| Image | First issued | Design | Serial format | Serials issued | Notes |
|---|---|---|---|---|---|
| | | White text on black background | AB1234 | | |
