= Vehicle registration plates of Norfolk Island =

Norfolk Island vehicle license plates

Norfolk Island
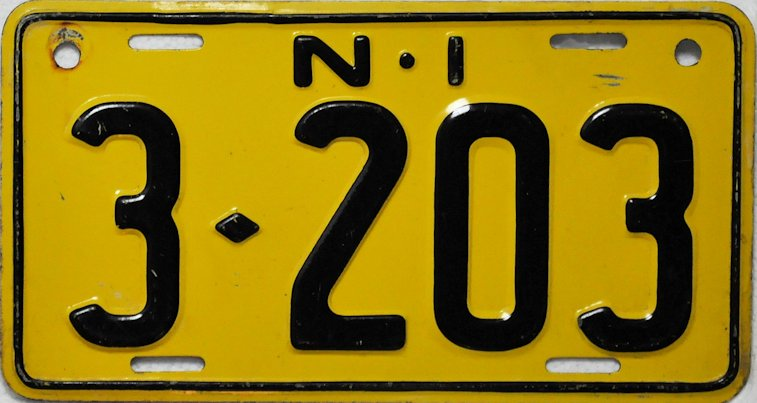
- Regular legal standard number plate from Norfolk Island.
- Country: Norfolk Island
- Country code: AUS
- Colour (front): Black on yellow
- Colour (rear): Black on yellow

Norfolk Island requires its residents to register their motor vehicles and display vehicle registration plates. Current plates are shorter than the Australian standard 372 mm × 134 mm (14.6 in × 5.3 in), and use Australian stamping dies.

Prior to the 1961 adaption of the current format, hand painted plates were issued. After 1961, NI started to use Australian standard dies plates in black on yellow and the format are all numeric for vehicles and motorbikes in C-123 format. Administrative vehicles are issued in Red A and black on white base in numerics shown as A-123 and motorcycles A C-12.

Norfolk Island plates are continuing to be issued despite that NI is now under New South Wales transport laws since 1 July 2016, following the cessation of self government. It is issued via the Shire Council as the issuing authority.

Image	First issued	Design	Slogan	Serial format	Serials issued	Notes
	1961		None	1 to 7-999		Reissued cancelled blocks from 1-000 early in the 2010s and then started issuing from 7000 from 2020.
