= Vehicle registration plates of the Northern Territory =

Northern Territory of Australia vehicle license plates

The Northern Territory of Australia requires its residents to register their motor vehicles and display vehicle registration plates. Current regular issue plates are to the standard Australian dimensions of 372 mm (14.6 in) in length by 134 mm (5.3 in) in height, and use standard Australian serial dies.

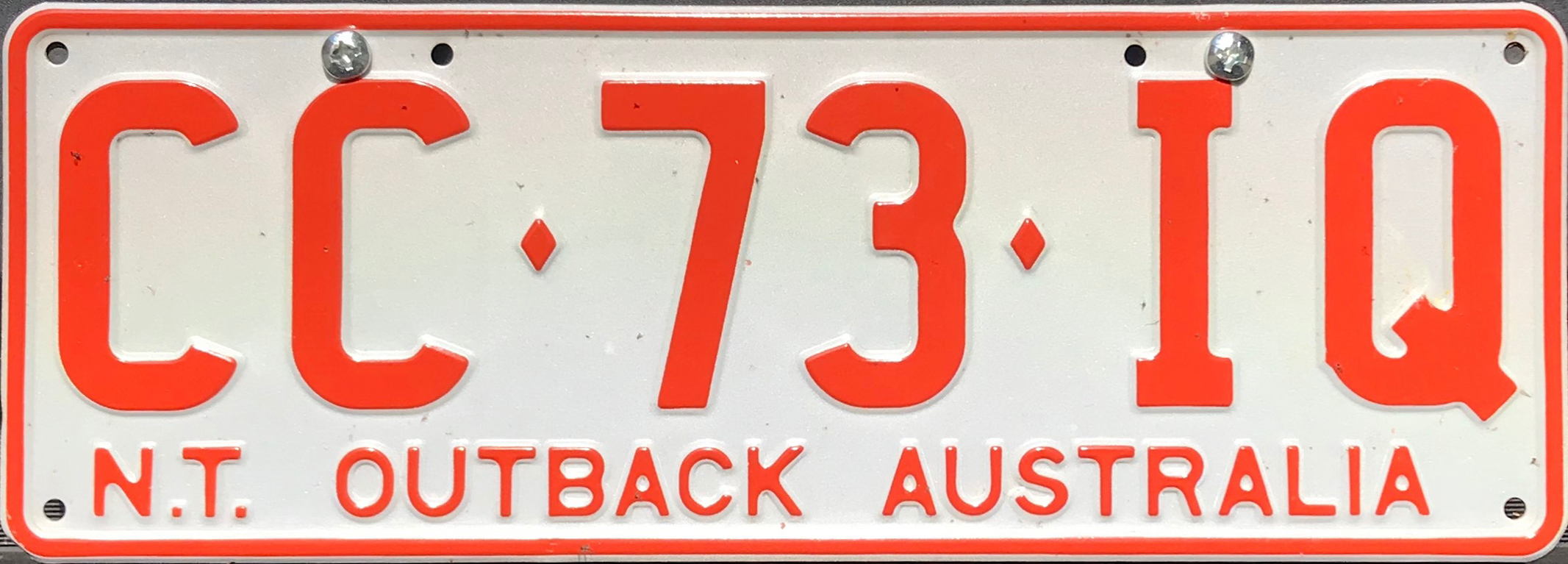
General Series (current)

* General series: CA·12·BC

* Motorcycle: A·1234

* Trailer: TA·1234

The Northern Territory has never fully adopted the 1950s three letter, three number Federal scheme. It was proposed to receive XAA-000 to XZZ-999 that Western Australia later took up.

Prior to 1933 Registration plates in the NT was between Central Australia and Northern Australia for 5 years, as NA & CA has their own registration plates until the merger in 1933 back into Northern Territory.

1933 to 1953 Plates were made in the style similar to Q plates in Qld, with NT shown on a white band at the left and the numericals in white on black.

1953 to 1979 Registration plates in the NT were simply five numbers these being white on a black background. [e.g. 12-354], by the 1970s it reached 100-000 so a 6-digit version was added and ran until 1979 when it changed to ochre on white plates. All black-and-white plates were recalled and replaced on expiry of registration, retention fees applied if the motorist wished to keep the original number.

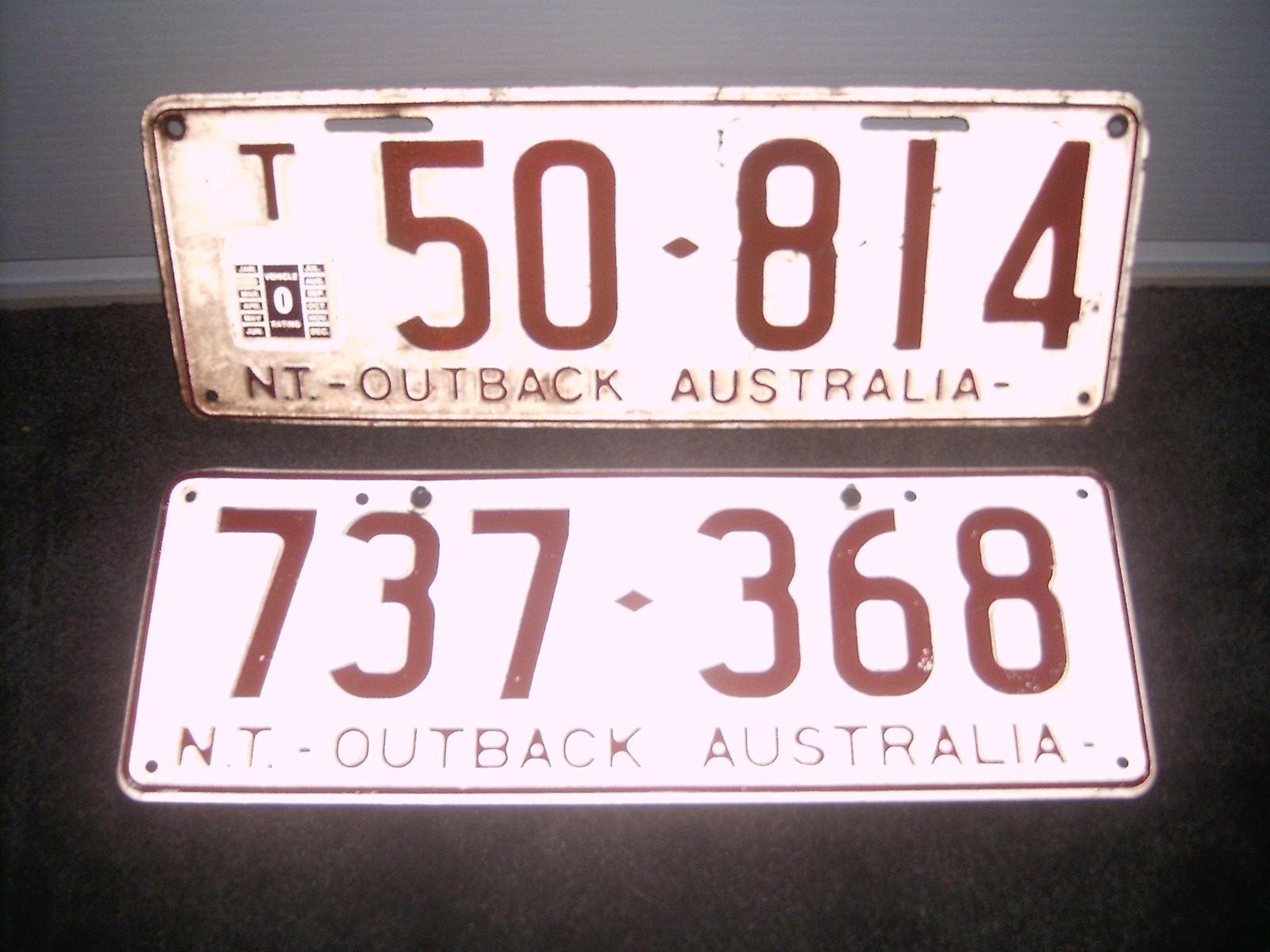
NT – Outback Australia. T indicates trailer

1979 to 2011 NT plates have six numbers in ochre on a white background, with the slogan "Northern Territory: Outback Australia". Motorcycle plates have five numbers. There doesn't seem to be a noticeable system to plate series, as numbers of all types appear on both halves of the plate.

NTG (Northern Territory Government) 800-000 to 899-999 and Cycles 80-000 to 85-999, has the NTG embossed at the left hand side of a standard plate, while NTG was embossed on top of motorcycle plates. MO 8.000 series was also issued to Darwin Buses but has since been deregistered as these services were privatised. It continues to be issued as a standalone numeric allocation after 2011 when the general series moved to alphanumeric.

In 1987, the embossing has changed following a change of manufacturer into a non-standard embossing.

The same year, motorcycles and trailers plates were modified to accommodate registration labels to be displayed in a box below the T letter for trailers and at the right hand side for motorcycles. It happened for a while before the change of manufacturer.

In the 1990s MVR started offering custom, or combination of alphanumerics personalised in Ochre-white base, Black-white base and black-yellow base, with slogan options N.T. - OUTBACK AUSTRALIA or N.T. - NATURE TERRITORY - or N.T. at the top.

In 1998, Vehicle general series reverted to the Australian standard embossing used before 1987.

In the early 2000s slimline plates were introduced on personalised /custom or general series via remakes only.

By August 2008 it was reported both motorcycles and general series have reached the 9's and a new system was being looked into to replace the current system. It was reported that the MVR in the NT is looking at n-a-nnnn or aa-nnnn or the NSW aa-nn-aa format to replace it. It was expected to occur near the end of 2010.

As of 23 October 2009, the NT Government announced the chosen new plate format Ca-nn-aa. It will also replace the all numeric motorcycle series with alphanumeric series. The new series was unveiled in January 2011. It became available for issue in June 2011, with the same ochre on reflective white base and slogan slightly modified to show as NT OUTBACK AUSTRALIA without dash and full stops.

Motorcycles

From 1953, Motorcycles had the NT insert embossed at the left hand side while the remainder is embossed as 12-345 in white on black base.

From 1979, the ochre on reflective white base was introduced, with the slogan NT-OUTBACK AUSTRALIA for a brief period at the top before reverting to N.T.

Motorcycles since March 2011, have the new format adopted as A-1234 replacing the numerics issued since it began, is the 1st version.

in 2013, with the labels abolished, motorcycles plates had the box rego label space removed and alphanumeric characters realigned to the middle, hence version 2 of the current format began but it lasted for about 2,500 before changing again.

As of October 2015, motorcycles have changed the embossing back into the standard Australian motorcycle starting from A-8900's, hence the 3rd version since the March 2011 changeover.

Trailer Plates

Trailer plates used the Tnn-nnn format up it was exhausted in 1998 after which Ta-nnnn was implemented. This was previously on a black on yellow base until 1979 when the current ochre on white slogan plates were introduced.

As of 2026, it has been updated to show large T aligning with the rest of the alpha numeric characters.

Special purpose plates

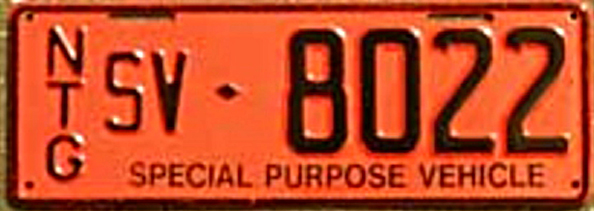
Government

Special purpose plates offered are MO (Buses), MB (Mini Buses), Private Hire PH, Taxi, SUB taxi series, TV (Tourist Vehicle), SPV (Special Purpose Vehicle), LV (Limousine Vehicle), CV (Courtesy Vehicle), D - Dealer Trade series and SFV (Special Function Vehicle)

Dealer Trade series was in annual cyclic colours before changing to the yellow on black reflective base then finally into current ochre on reflective white base.

MO bus plates from 1953 until 1987 was in yellow on black base which was later reflective in the 1980s and was replaced by the current blue on mid yellow base. Initially it used wheat base but changed to mid yellow base. MO plates moved into white on orange base as of 2024.

TV Tourist Bus plates was introduced in the early 1990s from TV-000 to TV-999 in white and green base. Once it reached 999, it moved over to TV-00A and now changed colours to Blue on mid yellow from TV-00G for a while until it moved in 2024 to TV-1000 onwards with a change of colour to white on orange base.

Lorry plates in small L embossing and in white on black was introduced in 1953 but lasted only 3 years and was recalled & replaced by the standard general series.

in the 2010s, a new club plate scheme has replaced the VCC (Vintage Car Club) scheme, with embossed legend CLUB down left vertical and bottom legend "NT-MOTOR ENTHUSIAST" and is white on reflective red.

Commemorative plates

- 1987: Australian Bicentenary plates were released to celebrate the period 1788 to 1988. These were offered with green or ochre text on a reflective white background with the Bicentenary logo between the characters.
- 2001: a Centenary of Federation series was released to commemorate the 1901 to 2001 anniversary of Australia's federation. The series had a black background with white characters in the format CF001 to CF999.
- 2008: to commemorate the 30th anniversary of the Northern Territory forming independent government outside of South Australia, a series of blue characters on a white background was made available. The format was 700-000 to 710-000.
- 2011: the NT released a special series to commemorative the centenary since the Territory was established in 1911. These were produced with red text on reflective black in the nnnn-NT format. Due to complaints that these plates were too hard to read by enforcement cameras, the plates were recalled and remade into the ordinary ochre text/white base with the usual NT – Outback Australia slogan.
- May 2016: the NT released commemorative plates to mark 75 years since Darwin was bombed during World War II. The range BOD-000 to BOD-999 was allocated. The plates are on sale for $150 and available to purchase from 14 May 2016 to 27 February 2017. The slogan screen printed at the base of the plate is NT – The Territory Remembers 1942–2017 with a Supermarine Spitfire (fighter aircraft) graphic between characters. The plate is produced with blue text on a reflective white base.
- June 2020: a new general release number plate "Territory Together" was available at no extra cost as a tribute to frontline workers across the NT. The plate is white with ochre lettering in the format NT9500 to NT9999. An image of police and healthcare workers separates the letters and numbers.

== Discontinued plates ==
- Lorry series: L·nnnn Issued until 1953 when it was replaced by the general series. All have been recalled.
