= Vehicle registration plates of Christmas Island =

Christmas Island vehicle license plates

Christmas Island
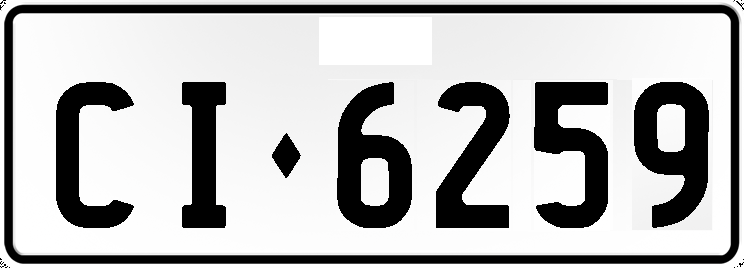
- Country code: AUS

Current series
- Slogan: None
- Size: 372 mm × 134 mm 14.6 in × 5.3 in
- Serial format: CI•1234
- Introduced: 2003; 22 years ago

History
- First issued: 1972; 53 years ago

Vehicle registration plates of Christmas Island started to be issued in 1972. Current plates are Australian standard 372 mm × 134 mm (14.6 in × 5.3 in), and the current series started in 2003.

== Vehicle types ==
Vehicle types
Type	Example	Meaning
General issue		
General issue		
