= Vehicle registration plates of the Australian Capital Territory =

Australian Capital Territory vehicle registration plates

The Australian Capital Territory requires its residents to register their motor vehicles and display vehicle registration plates. Current regular issue plates are to the standard Australian dimensions of 372 mm (14.6 in) in length by 134 mm (5.3 in) in height, and use standard Australian serial dies.

== Previous general series ==
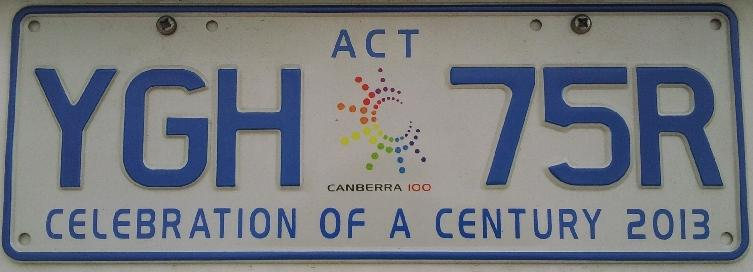
Canberra – Celebration of a Century

YAA·000

Up to 1968, ACT Plates were issued in numerics from 1 to 99-935 (the last one issued) in white on navy blue. From September 1968 the Yaa-nnn series commenced (in blue on reflective white) at YAB. YAA was set aside for recalls of numericals, but public pressure led to a backflip and the authorities allowed motorists to retain their existing numbers as long as they converted them into blue on reflective white, for a fee.

ACT plates were the first of any region in Australia to be reflective, this commenced at YAA-nnn.

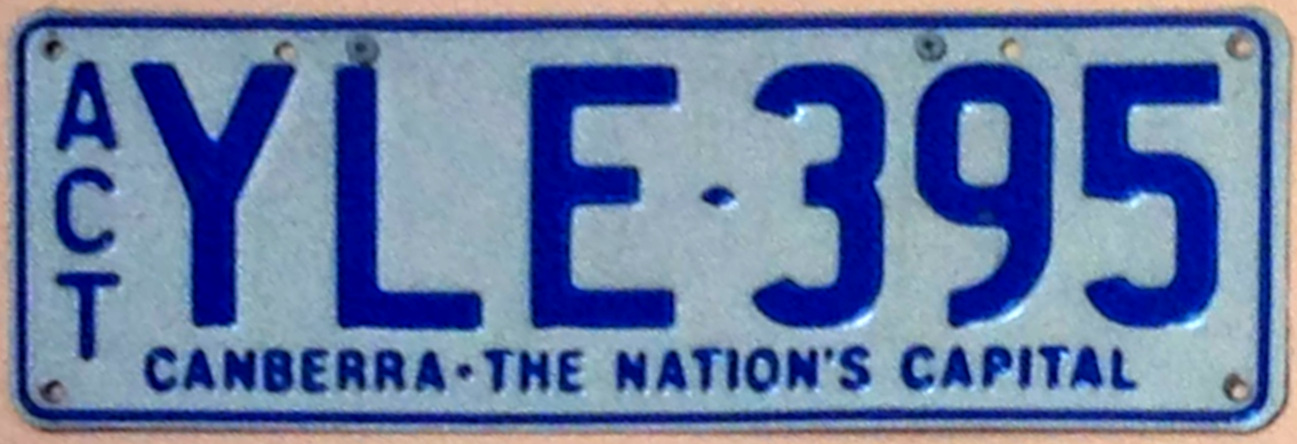
Canberra – The Nation's Capital

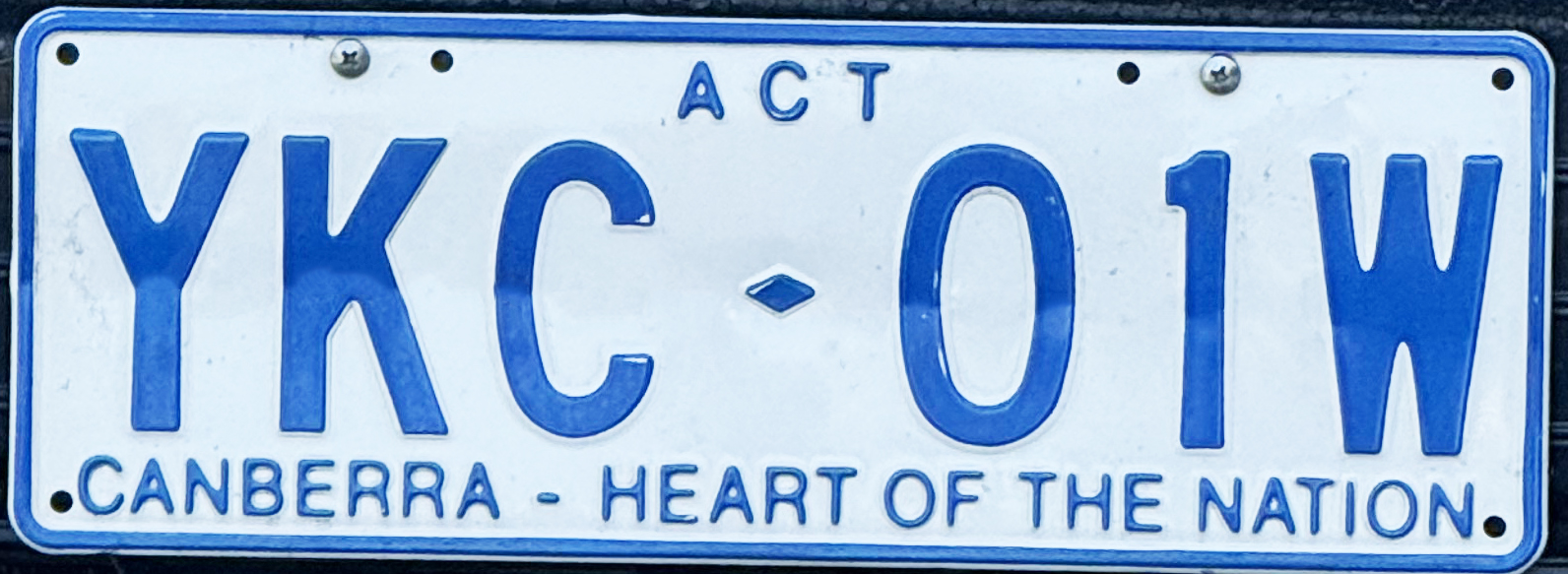
Canberra – Heart of the Nation. This slogan is optional on most cars that are in Canberra. It is now withdrawn from sale

By November 1979, It changed with the new slogan added to "ACT- Canberra The National Capital" starting at YMA-000 as the previous block stopped at YJZ-999.

In 1983, following the change of Federal Government, blocks of YKA to YKK's in the previous style were allocated to the public as it was found in storage.

To celebrate the Bicentennial celebrations in 1988, new vehicle registrations received plates from YRS-000 to YSP-999 that had a black outline of the new Parliament House in the middle, flanked by 1788 on the left and 1988 on the right. As these special plates become evermore rarer, they are sought after and particularly valuable. Remakes have been done in current embossing style.

In early 1996, as YZZ-999 was reached, it went back to YKL to continue filling the unused allocation in the ACT- Canberra The National Capital slogan, and filled unused YAQ, YBQ, YCQ, YDQ, YEQ, YFQ, YGQ, YHQ, YIQ, YJQ, before ending as YLZ-999.

== Current general series ==
YAA·00A

In 1998 when the previous series was exhausted, the series changed to Yaa-nna. The previous Feel the Power Slogan was replaced by the original "ACT – Canberra The Nation's Capital" and an optional slogan was offered "ACT – Canberra Heart of the Nation".

In 1999, manufacturer changes lead to the adoption of NSW Premium embossed dies on ACT plates and continues today. This started from 'YAT-00A'.

Since 2007 a special series bearing the slogan "ACT-Celebration of a Century 2013" is being issued in commemoration of Canberra's centenary year in 2013. These plates were issued starting with YGA-00A, then at end of YGZ-99Z it skipped over to YIA-00A.

Since 8 July 2015, a new slogan has been offered, CANBERRA – AN AGE FRIENDLY CITY, as an additional option to the existing slogans. The ranges YKQ-00A to YKQ-99Z and YLP-00A to YLP-99Z have been allocated for this new slogan.

Canberra - The Nation's Capital series has also been updated as the alphanumerics has been embossed closer rather than the wider and the ink colour changed to a slightly darker blue tone.

As of January 2017, the ACT Government announced it is shortlisting 10 new slogans and has asked the public to choose only one new slogan.

The new ACT number plate slogan ideas decided by the panel to be voted on are:

NGUNNAWAL COUNTRY
AUSTRALIA’S MEETING PLACE
CBR – AN ACTIVE CITY
CBR – CITY OF DIVERSITY
CBR – DRIVING THE NATION
CBR – GREEN AND CLEAN
CBR – BRILLIANT POSSIBILITIES
CBR – FOR ALL SEASONS
CANBERRA – THE BUSH CAPITAL
CBR – AUSTRALIA’S COOL CAPITAL

Then the public has to choose one winning existing slogan out of 4 current slogans. CANBERRA - THE NATION'S CAPITAL, CANBERRA-AGE FRIENDLY CITY, FEEL THE POWER OF CANBERRA and the Parliament House logo. The losing 3 slogans will then be phased out once the new slogan plates will be manufactured in the middle of 2017. Results were announced in March 2017. Results went out this week as of 13 March 2017 - CANBERRA – THE BUSH CAPITAL won the vote and will form part of the new slogan choice along with the CANBERRA - THE NATION'S CAPITAL. The new slogan production, released on 3 July 2017.

Production of FEEL THE POWER OF CANBERRA, CANBERRA - THE HEART OF THE NATION and CANBERRA - THE AGE FRIENDLY CITY and PARLIAMENT HOUSE plates will cease.

As of 8 December 2017, following the formal legal status of the Same Sex Marriage legislation, the ACT Government announced that a Rainbow themed number plate will be released soon, and instead of the traditional slogan, the rainbow colour will run at the bottom of the plates.

As of September 2018, the new ACT slimline plates was released, and is the same as NSW style but colour is blue on white and ACT identifier stamped on plate.

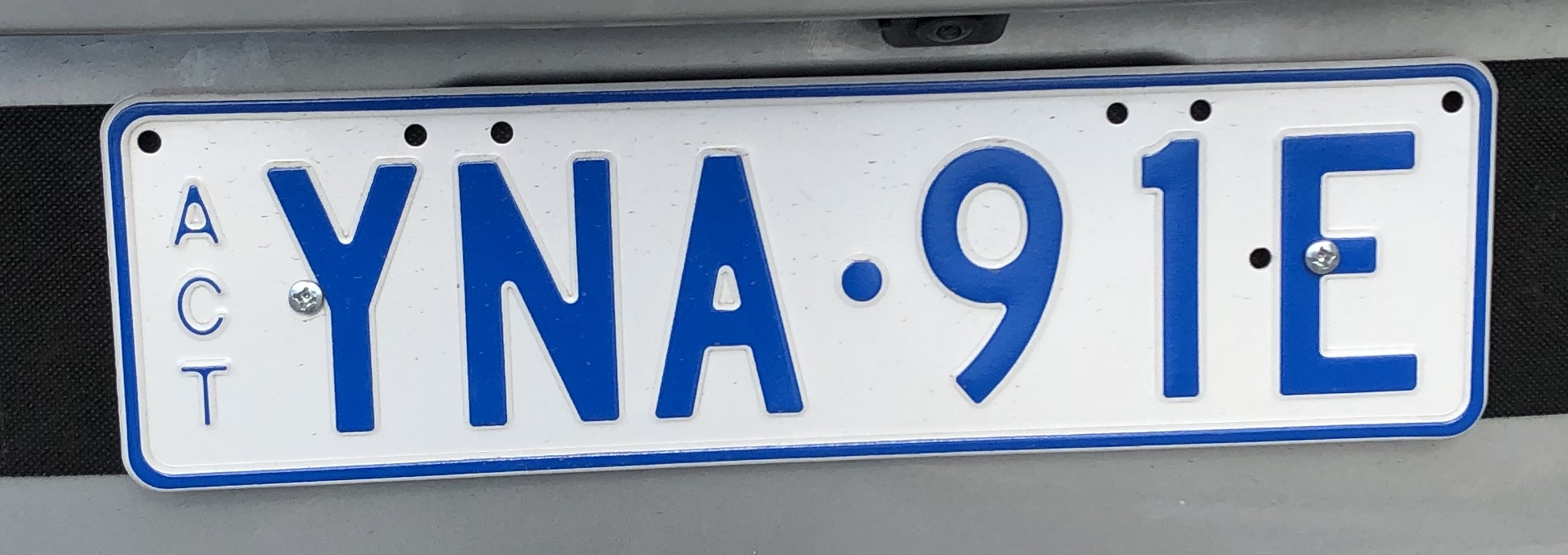
ACT Slimline Plate

Motorcycle - A·0000

It has been the all numeric series since the beginning of the FCT/ACT registration, starting at 1 and ended at 99-999 in its current colour format – blue on reflective white, which was initially non reflective white until 1968. As of 21 December 2017, the series reached 99-999. As of 22 April 2018, the new alphanumeric series for motorcycles are now on the roads starting from A·0000 onwards.

Trailer - T 0000 A

The previous series T-n(nnnn as required) was used, initially in black on yellow base, later blue on reflective white base. When the number sequence reached T-99-999, plates were issued commencing at T 0000 A onwards since 2002. In the previous series for a brief period, the National Capital slogan was used but since the start of the new series, the ACT top legend returned.

== Personalised ==
Personalised plates - AA·000

In January 1984, ACT began offering personalised plates in that range from AA-000 to ZZ-999 in blue on reflective white base with the usual slogans as the general series.

Plastic flat plates started to be offered since 1992 in a printed plastic plates coming in white on different colours as red, blue, green, black and later pink, orange. Due to premature cracking of the original plastic, the manufacture changed it to plexiglass as of 1999. Comes in 12-345, AB-123, YAB-123 or YAB-12D formats.

YAA-000- YZZ-999 and YAA-00A to YZZ-99Z are also included.

Skipped Combinations: 12-345, 99–936 to 99-999, YAB-12C, YIR-00A to YIZ-99Z

Over these years, Euro and the more recently Japanese Domestic Market plates have been released as of 1st October 2025.

== Special purpose issues ==
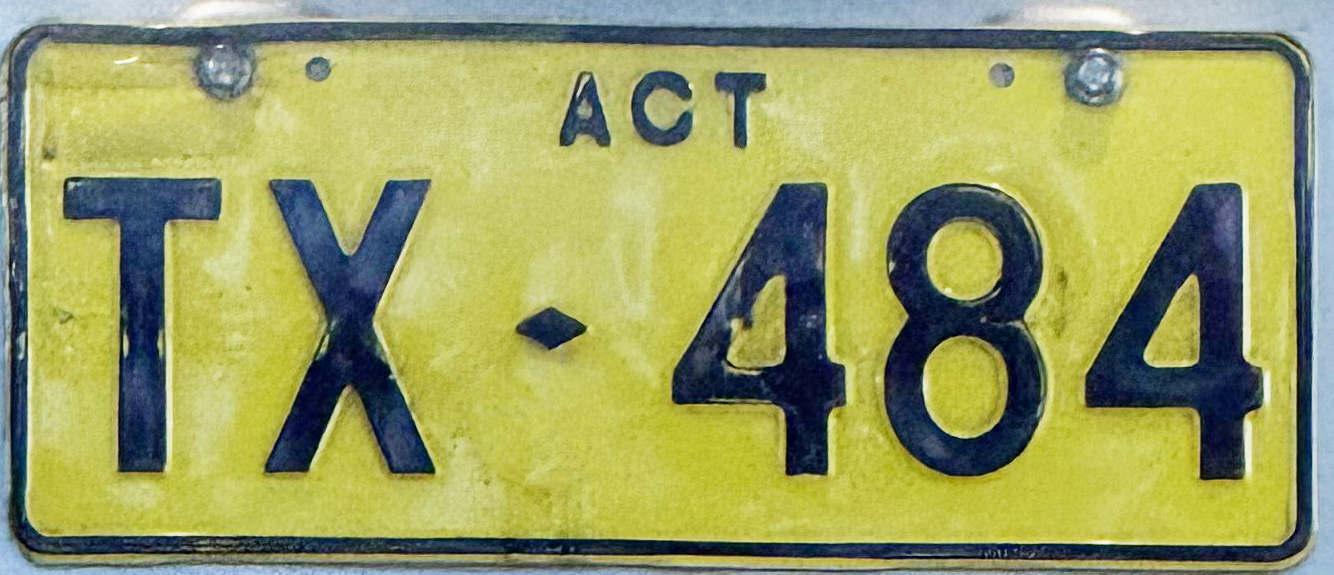
Taxicab

Bus (Government)

Bus (other)

Public transport vehicles are allocated distinctive codes:

- BUS-nnn (ACTION government buses, rear-only plate on newer buses) – orange on white
- MO-n, MO-nn, and MO-nnn (other buses) – black on yellow
- H-n, H-nn and H-nnn (chauffeur-driven hire cars) – black on yellow
- TX-n, TX-nn, and TX-nnn (taxicabs). – black on yellow. Taxi plates in the ACT numbered below TX-300 are plates which can be traded, and are estimated to be worth around $200,000. Recently the ACT government has issued over 100 plates which are leased from the government, cannot be traded or transferred, and are leased for a term of four years, with one renewal available. These plates are in the series TX-400 which can be found on any type of taxi, and TX-900 and above are reserved for, and bear the legend 'Restricted Taxi', which is for the use of Wheelchair Accessible Taxis which have an obligation to give priority to wheelchair-disabled persons.

ACT Government vehicles are allocated codes 2nn-nnn. The plates are red/brown on reflective white with ACT GOVERNMENT below the number.

ActewAGL vehicles are issued with plates in the format of YWE-nnn, the 'W' and 'E' standing for water and electricity.

Vehicles registered in the Jervis Bay Territory are issued ACT plates in the format of YZO-nnn until 2013 when YJJ-00A is now issued with a new format

- Historic issues – lorry plates in small "L" embossing and in black on white was introduced in 1940 but discontinued in 1958 and was recalled and replaced by the standard white on blue numeric general series.

== Vintage, veteran and historic cars ==
Historic vehicles owned by members of registered ACT motor vehicle clubs and used only for approved events may be granted special plates at concessional registration.

Until circa 1996 the plates were standard blue on reflective white with the following wording and numbering:

- Veteran cars built before 1919: ACT VETERAN CAR – nnn
- Vintage cars built from 1919 to 1930: ACT VINTAGE CAR – nnn
- Historic cars built after 1931 and more than 30 years old: ACT HISTORIC CAR – nnn

From c1996 the plates were reduced in size to approximately 253mm x 95mm with black lettering on reflective white. These have the Council of ACT Motor Clubs logo on the left with the following wording and numbering:

- Veteran cars built before 1919: VETERAN VEHICLE - ACT – nnn
- Vintage cars built from 1919 to 1930: VINTAGE VEHICLE - ACT – nnn
- Historic cars built after 1931 and more than 30 years old: HISTORIC VEHICLE - ACT – nnn or nnnn

== Discontinued plates ==
- Lorry series: L·nnnn Issued from 1928 until 1953 when it was replaced by the general series. All have been recalled.
