= Vehicle registration plates of Australia =

Australian vehicle registration plates

Australia
- Country: Australia
- Country code: AUS

Current series
- Serial format: Not standard

Australian vehicle registration plates, or number plates, and license plates are issued by state, territory, and Commonwealth governments, and the Australian Defence Force. The plates are associated with a vehicle and are generally intended to last during the time that the vehicle remains registered in the state, though as they become unreadable (or for other reasons) they may be remade with a like for like replacement. Motor vehicle registration in Australia can be renewed monthly, quarterly, half yearly or annually depending on the state or territory where the vehicle is registered.

== Current standard issue plates ==
=== Standard issue ===
State or territory	Text/background colour	Serial format	Legend/slogan	Current series	Notes
Australian Capital Territory	Blue/white	Yaa·nna	CANBERRA – THE NATION'S CAPITAL, CANBERRA – THE BUSH CAPITAL	YRU·00A	Slogan embossed at bottom. Slogans alternate by series. First prefix letter always Y. Thus Y can be in serial format. Otherwise only 'a' and 'n'.
Jervis Bay Territory	Blue/white	YJJ·nna	JERVIS BAY TERRITORY	YJJ·00B	Slogan screened at bottom.
New South Wales	Black/yellow	Da·nn·aa	NEW SOUTH WALES	DT·00·NA	Slogan embossed at bottom. Suffix letters IA-IZ and OA-OZ not used. D is current prefix letters, T prefix allocated to trailers. At the beginning of September 2025, some now have embossed EV symbols stamped into in place of a dot separator located prior to suffix letter.
Northern Territory	Ochre/white	Ca·nn·aa	N.T OUTBACK AUSTRALIA	CG·77·AA	Slogan embossed at bottom. Series began as a prefix C. Last two letters move first.
Queensland	Maroon/white	nnn·San	QUEENSLAND – SUNSHINE STATE	000·SB2	Slogan embossed at bottom. New series commenced in September 2020, starting at 000·AA2, No 0 or 1 used in suffix position.
South Australia	Black/white	Snnn·Daa	SOUTH AUSTRALIA	S000·DPA	Slogan embossed at bottom, State standard suffix letter is S throughout series. Middle suffix Q allocated for government vehicles; all 25 other letters used. T is allocated for trailers. D is current prefix letters.
Tasmania	Blue/white	N nn aa	Tasmania – Explore the possibilities.	N 00 SA	State logo (a thylacine in reeds) screened at left. Slogan screened at bottom. Suffix letters IA-IZ and OA-OZ not used. N is current prefix letter.
Victoria	Blue/white	2Ga·naa	VICTORIA – THE EDUCATION STATE	2GJ·1AA	Slogan screened at bottom, No 0 used in 1st or 4th position. All 26 other letters used in all letter positions.
Western Australia	Blue/white	1Jaa·nnn	WESTERN AUSTRALIA	1JEQ·000	Motif screened at top featuring a white background, blue skyline, desert sun and legend. No 0 used in 1st numeric position, Allocated are F for platinum slimline, Q for government, and T, U, V, and W for trailers.

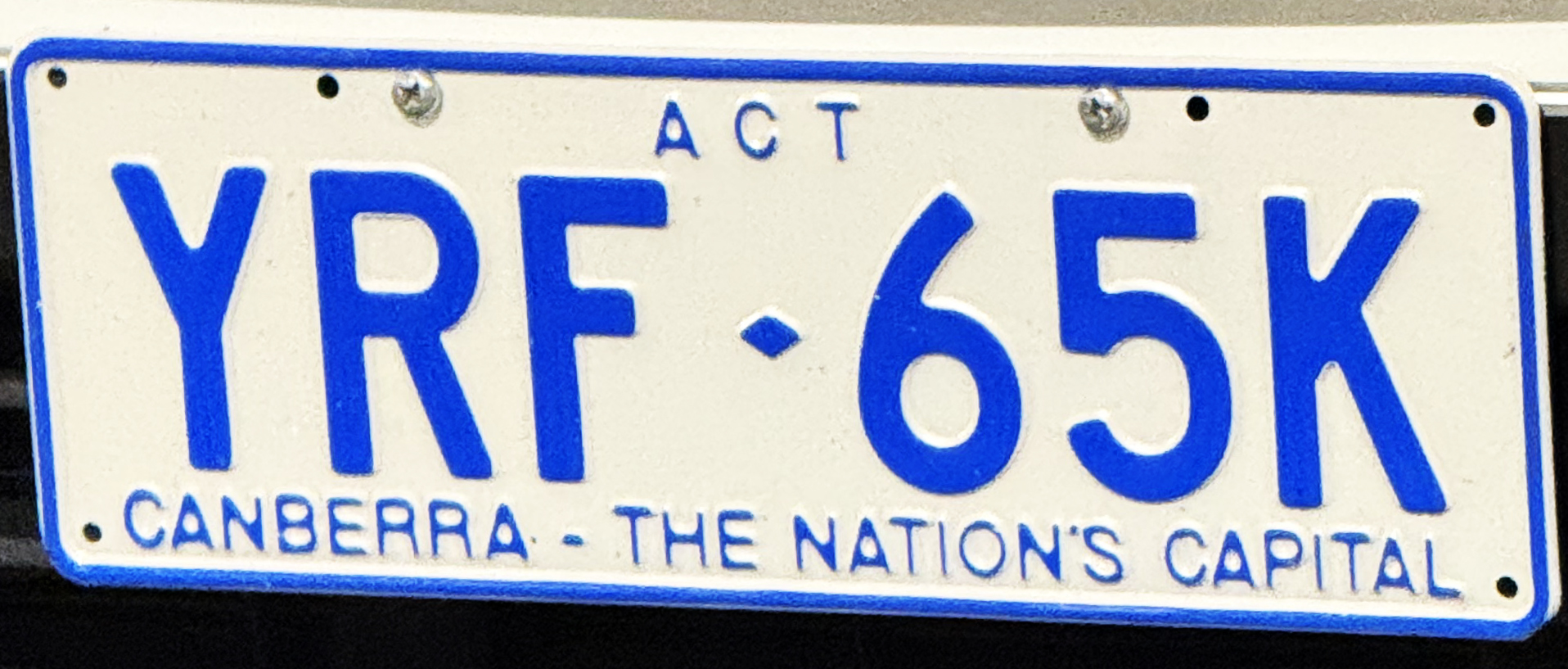
Current standard series (ACT)

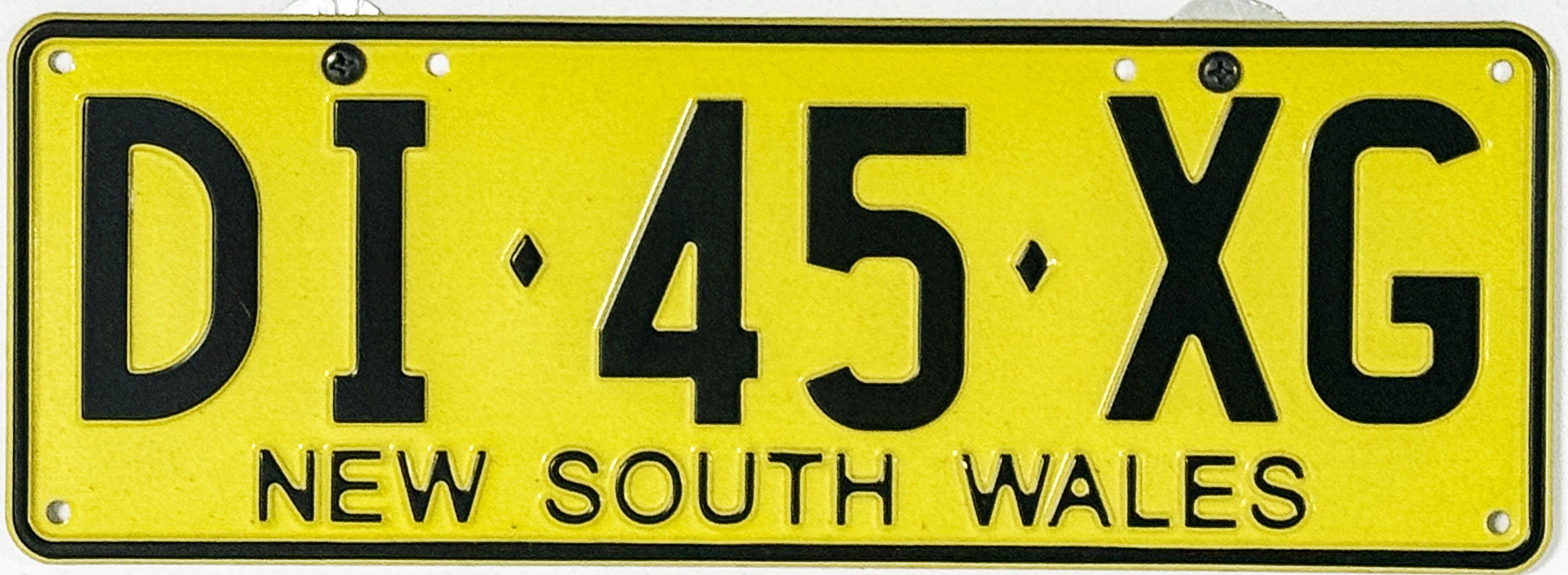
Current standard series (NSW)

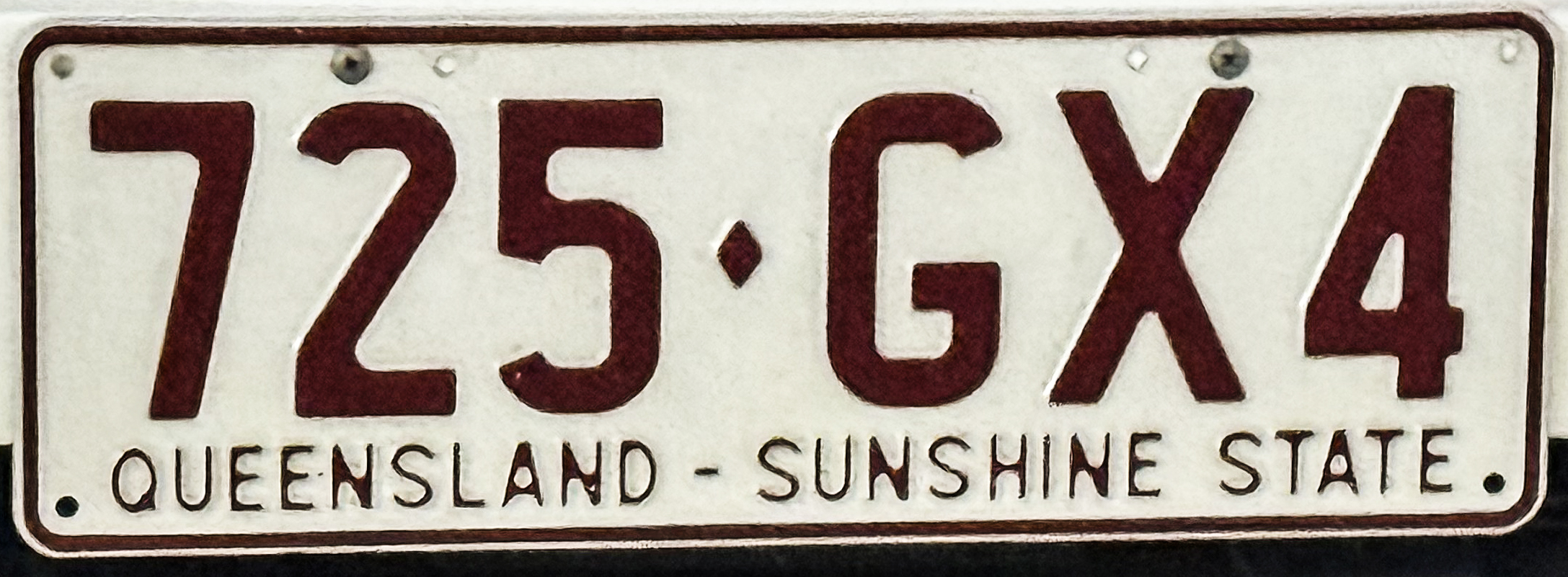
Current standard series (QLD)

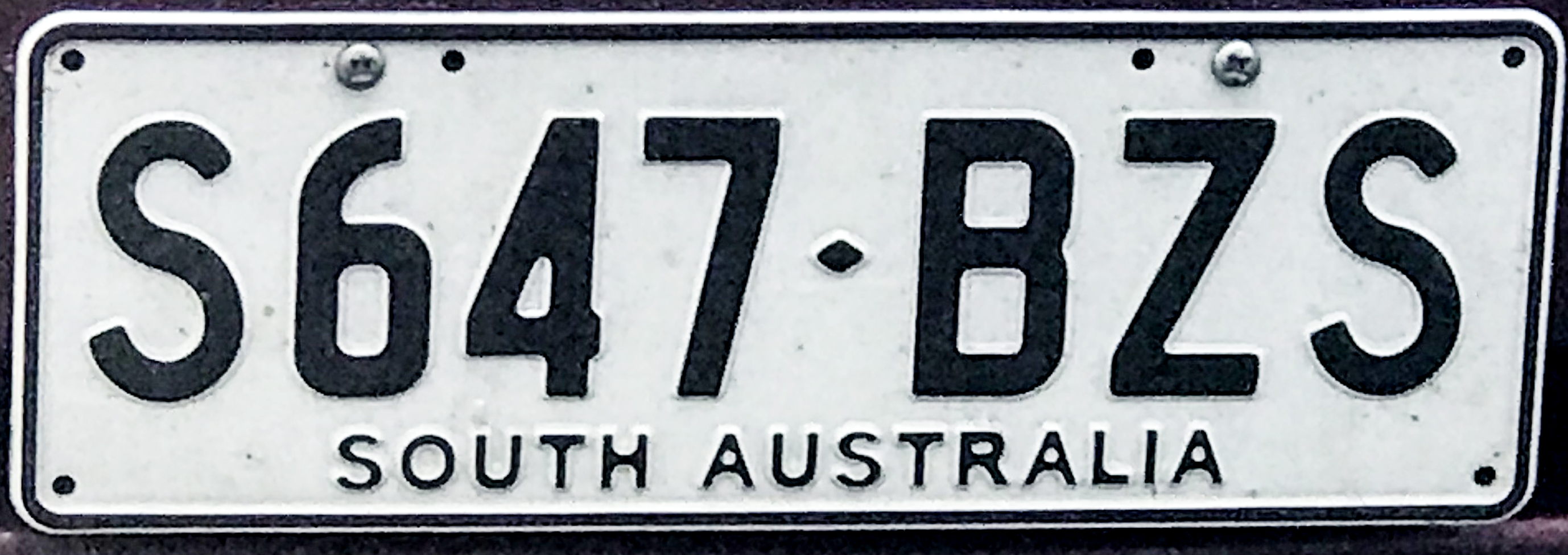
Current standard series (SA)

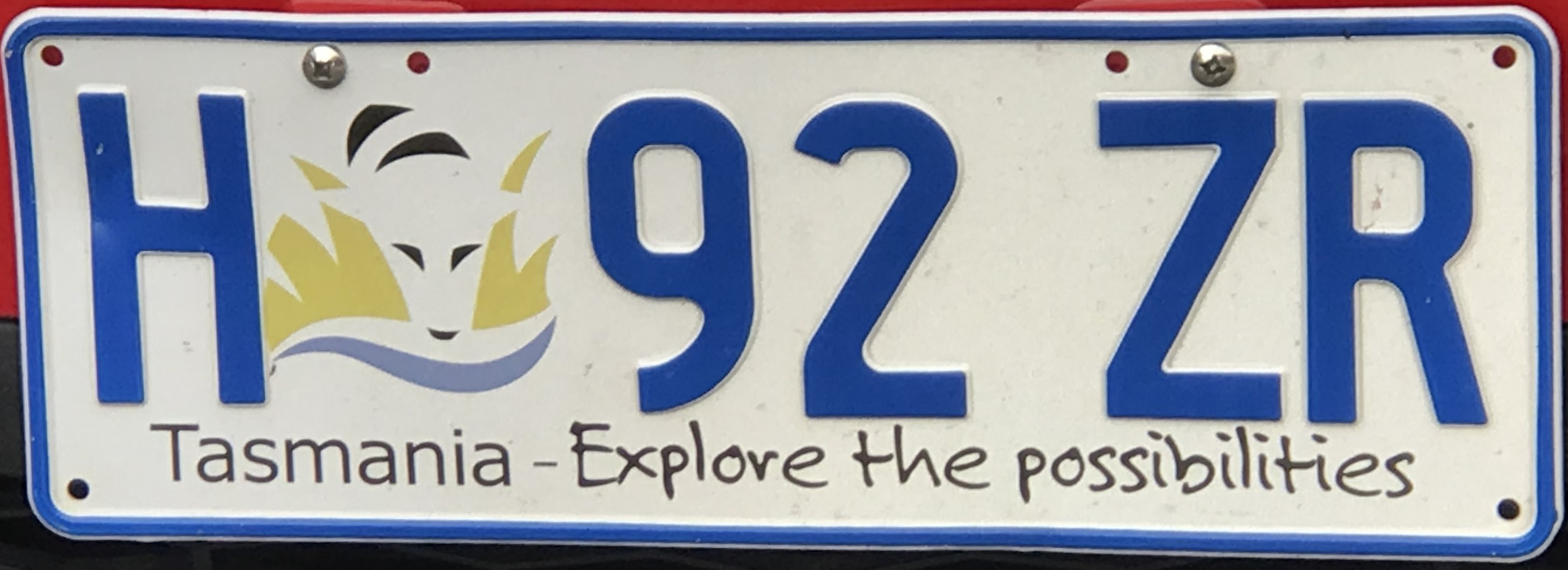
Current standard series (TAS)

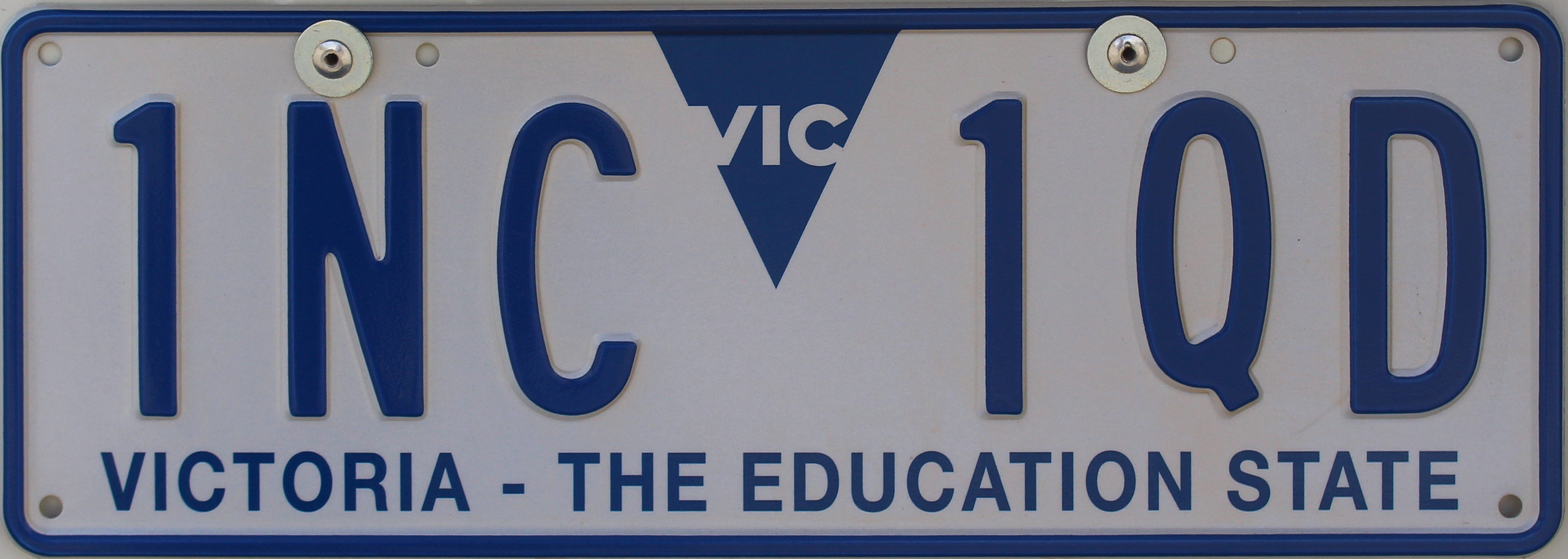
Current standard series (VIC)

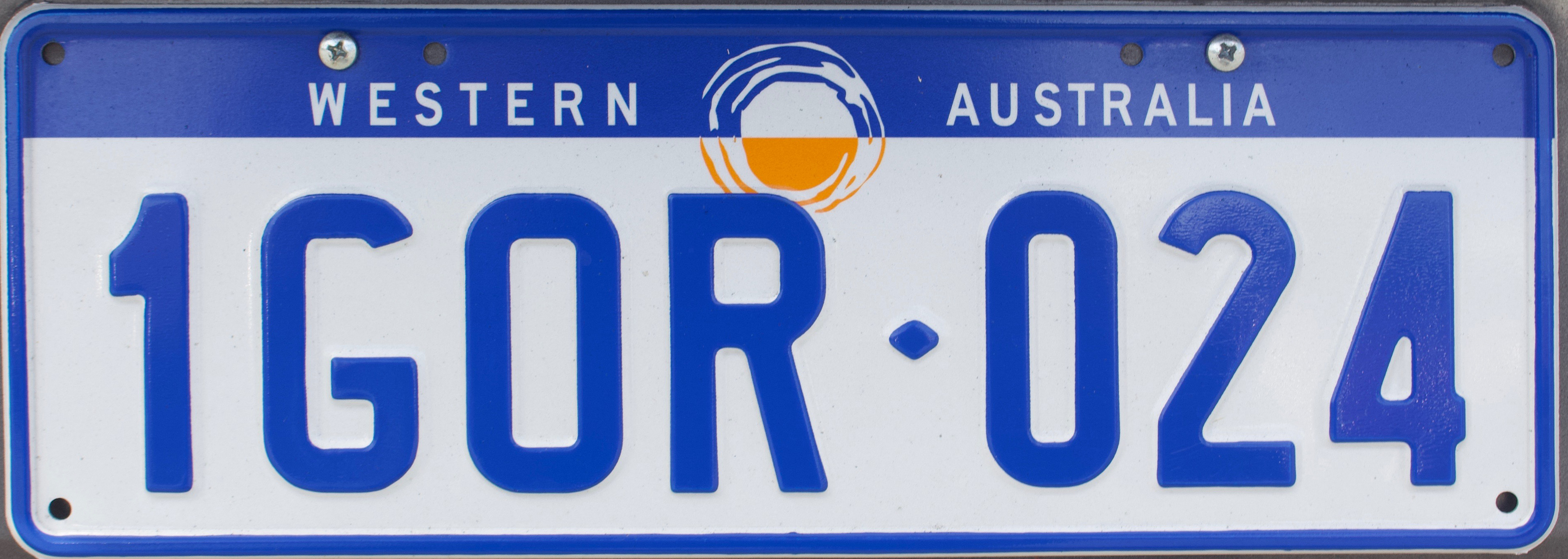
Current standard series (WA)

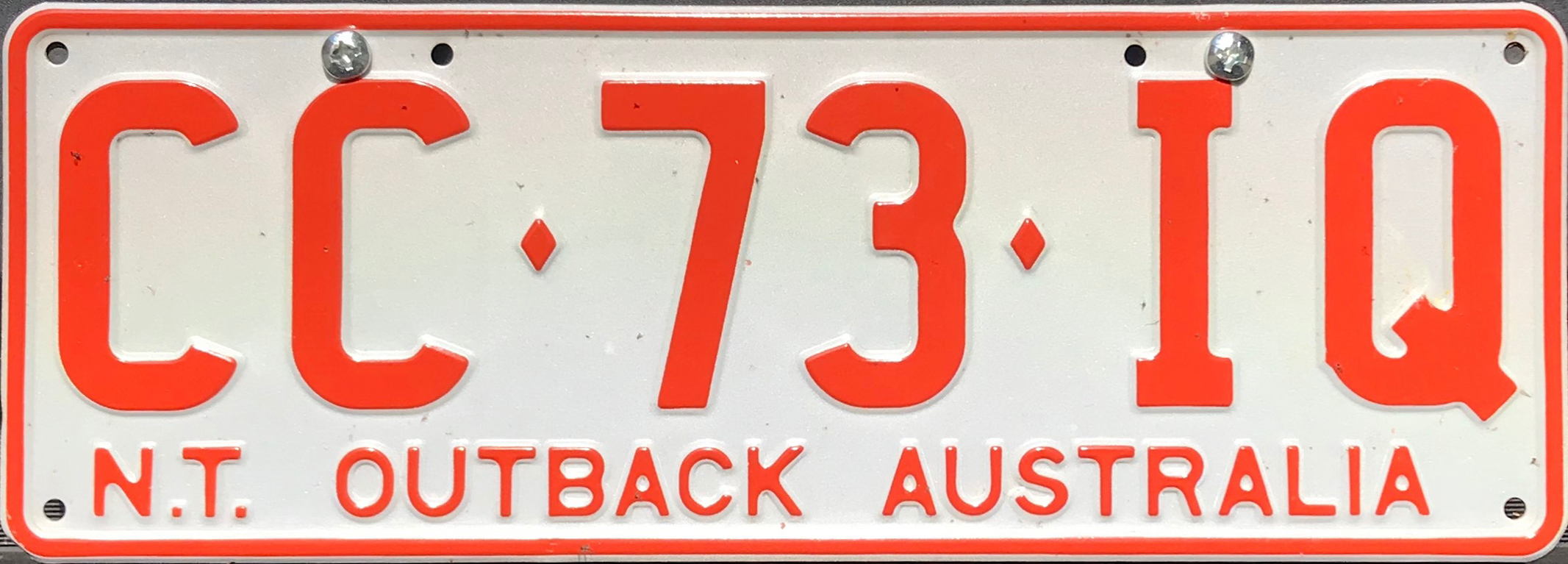
Current standard series (NT)

=== Other issue ===
State or territory	Text/background colour	Serial format	Legend/slogan	Current series	Notes
Australian Capital Territory	Blue/white	Yaa·nna	ACT	YTH·00A	ACT "Premium" slimline; no slogan.
New South Wales	Black/white	Gaa·nna	NSW Serial format should consist of only 'a' and 'n', since first letter varies	GHH·00A	NSW "Premium" slimline; no slogan. At beginning of Sept 2025, some now have embossed EV symbols stamped into in place of a dot separator.
New South Wales	White/black	CAa·nna	NSW	CAT·00A	NSW "Premium" slimline; no slogan. Always starts with CA (For foreseeable future).
New South Wales	Silver/black	DGa·nna	NSW	DGS·00A	NSW "Premium" slimline; no slogan. Always starts with DG (For foreseeable future).
New South Wales	Black/white	Yaa·nna	NSW	YRV·00A	Slimline; dealer or fleet manager logo printed at bottom. Dealer/fleet branded plate is either sold or leased together with vehicle. Since 2022, Business branded plates are offered if minimum 5 or more are ordered. Read more.
New South Wales	Indigo/white	nnnnn·J	NSW – HISTORIC VEHICLE	93000·J	Slogan now embossed on plate since May 2024, plate is motorcycle sized & smaller than slimline, vehicles must be at least 30 years old to apply.
New South Wales	Green/white	nnnnn·E	NSW – CONDITIONAL	80000·E	Slogan now embossed on plate since July 2024.
New South Wales	Maroon/white	nnnnn·R	NSW – RALLY PERMIT	13000·R	Slogan screen printed on plate, vehicles must be on a rally track.
New South Wales	Maroon/white	nnnnn·F	NSW – CLASSIC VEHICLE	13000·F	NSW - Slogan embossed on plate, vehicles must be on CVS scheme starting on 1 July 2024. Confirmed sighted as F suffix series.
New South Wales	Maroon/white	nnnn·D	NSW – CLASSIC CYCLE	5000·D	NSW - Slogan embossed on plate, vehicles must be on CVS scheme starting on 1 July 2024. Combination as example at this stage until actual issue.
South Australia	Black/white	Fa·nnna	SA	FF·000F	"Premium" slimline; no slogan.
South Australia	White/black	Xa·nnna	SA	XH·000A	"Premium" slimline; no slogan.
South Australia	Blue/white	Snnn·BQa	SA GOVERNMENT	S000·BQN	For SA Government Vehicles only, Q Represents "Queen".
Victoria	White/black	Eaa·nnn	VIC (vertically on left)	EJA·000	"Premium" slimline, no slogan.
Victoria	Red/white	Maa·nnn	VICTORIA – THE EDUCATION STATE	MDV·000	Slogan screen printed on plate, for VIC government owned/leased vehicles only.
Victoria	Blue/white	nnnnn·P	PRIMARY PRODUCER VICTORIA – THE EDUCATION STATE	13000·P	Slogan screen printed on plate, for vehicles engaged solely or substantially in agricultural, horticultural, viticultural, dairying, pastoral or other like pursuits.
Victoria	White/green	BSnn·aa	VIC – ACCREDITED BUS SERVICE	BS16·AA	Slogan screen printed on bus plate.
Victoria	White/burgundy	nnn·Hnn	CLUB PERMIT VICTORIA	310·H00	Slogan screen printed at top "Club Permit", Victoria at bottom, vehicles must be at least 25 years old to apply.
Victoria	White/burgundy	nnnnn·M	CLUB PERMIT VICTORIA	07000·M	Slogan screen printed at top "Club Permit", Victoria at bottom, for highly modified vehicles, vehicles must be at least 25 years old.
Victoria	White/navy blue	nnnn·RP	RALLY PERMIT VICTORIA	7000·RP	Slogan screen printed at top "Rally Permit", Victoria at bottom, for vehicles used in rallies organised by a national motorsport organisation recognised by VicRoads.
Queensland	White/black	nnn·Ana	QLD	000·A2F	QLD Sequential Series; no slogan. Commenced on 6 September 2024. Numbers change first.
Queensland	Maroon/white	T·nnnnn	Taxis	T·64000	Standard Slogan "Queensland – Sunshine State".
Queensland	Maroon/white	1a·nnn	QLD Farm plates	1C·000	QLD Farm plates.
Queensland	Maroon/white	F·nnnnn	QLD Farm plates	F·99000	QLD Farm plates.
Queensland	Maroon/white	QG·aann	QLD Government used vehicles	QG·XC00	Standard Slogan "Queensland – Sunshine State".
Western Australia	Silver/black	1Faa·nnn	WA (vertically on left)	1FDX·000	"Platinum" slimline, No Slogan, No 0 used in 1st position.
Western Australia	White/blue	1QCa·nnn	WESTERN AUSTRALIA	1QCN·000	For WA Government Vehicles only, Motif screened at top featuring a blue background, white skyline, desert sun and legend, No 0 used in 1st position.

=== Trailers ===
State or territory	Text/background colour	Serial format	Legend/slogan	Current series	Notes
Australian Capital Territory	Blue/white	T nnnn a	ACT	T 0000 N	Legend embossed at top.
New South Wales	Black/yellow	Ta·nn·aa	NSW – TRAILER	TQ·00·BB	Legend embossed at bottom. New series commenced in December 2014, serials began at TA·00·AA, the whole TI & TO suffix series are both skipped. Suffix letters IA-IZ and OA-OZ not used.
New South Wales	Black/white	TU·nn·aa	NSW	TU·00·FA	Serials began at TR·00·AA. Suffix letters IA-IZ and OA-OZ not used.
Northern Territory	Ochre/white	Ta·nnnn	N.T. – OUTBACK AUSTRALIA –	TW·0000	Legend embossed at bottom.
Queensland	Maroon/white	nnn·Uaa	QUEENSLAND – SUNSHINE STATE	000·UYI	Issued to large trailers (over 1.02t ATM). Legend embossed at bottom.
Queensland	Maroon/white	Ga·nnnn	QLD	GC•0000	Issued to small trailers (up to 1.02t ATM).
South Australia	Black/white	Snnn·Taa	SOUTH AUSTRALIA	S000·TNA	Legend embossed at bottom. Letter Q not used and reserved for government vehicles; all 25 other letters used.
Tasmania	Blue/white	X nn aa	Tasmania – Explore the possibilities	X 00 HA	State logo (a thylacine in reeds) screened at left. Legend screened at bottom. Serials Z 00 AA through Z 99 ZZ issued first, followed by Y 00 AA onwards, continuing to the next available prefix letter. Suffix letters IA-IZ and OA-OZ not used.
Victoria	Blue/white	nnn·nnE	VICTORIA – THE EDUCATION STATE	700·00E	Standard trailer plates have used a suffix series since September 2022. This change was implemented because of the high volume of active registrations in the previous series. Notably, the digit '0' is not used as the first number in this new format.
Victoria	White/black	nnn·nnZ	VIC	030·00Z	VIC Slimline; no slogan. Released March 2026.
Victoria	Blue/white	nnnn·Sn	VICTORIA – THE EDUCATION STATE	4400·S2	Issued to truck semi-trailers.
Victoria	Blue/white	nnnnn·A	VICTORIA – THE EDUCATION STATE	27000·A	Primary Producer plate, issued to articulated trailers. Additional "PRIMARY PRODUCER" legend screened at top.
Western Australia	Blue/white	1Uaa·nnn	WESTERN AUSTRALIA	1UDI·000	Motif screened at top featuring a white background, blue skyline, desert sun and legend. No 0 used in 1st position.

=== Motorcycles ===
State or territory	Text/background colour	Serial format	Legend/slogan	Current series	Notes
Australian Capital Territory	Blue/white	C·nnnn	ACT	C·3000	
New South Wales	Black/yellow	Iaa·nn	NSW	ILA·00	Serials progress backwards from ZZZ•99 to IAA•00. Combinations is expected to be replaced by late 2026 as an estimate only.
New South Wales	Black/white	Caa·nn	NSW	CYW·00	Serials progress forwards from AAA•00 to HZZ•99. Note: Dealer Branded and plain black on white general series used. Combinations expected to be replaced approx 2026 as an estimate only. In the interim issued unused gaps of blocks.
Northern Territory	Ochre/white	D·nnnn	NT	D·3000	
Queensland	Maroon/white	2Ea·nn	QLD	2FF·00	Amended info as become available as of week beginning from 21 August 2023.
South Australia	Black/white	Snn·Caa	SA	S00·CFC	Letter Q not used and reserved for government vehicles; all 25 other letters used.
Tasmania	Blue/white	Cnnna	TAS	C000G	
Victoria	Blue/white	3a·naa	VIC	3K·1AA	No 0 used in 1st or 3rd position. All 26 other letters used in all letter positions.
Victoria	White/black	5a·naa	VIC	5E·1AA	New release. No 0 used in 3rd position. All 26 other letters used in all letter positions.
Western Australia	Blue/white	1Ra·nnn	WA	1RO·000	No 0 used in 1st position.Switched to standard Aussie motorcycle size starting from 1RA-000 onwards. 1LP-999 is the last issued in this old size.

On all other motorcycle plates, the legend is embossed on top of the state or territory.

== History and Federal numbering scheme ==
=== Standards and federal allocations for all vehicles ===
From 1910 onwards, vehicle registration plates for each state started at number 1 and were manufactured in enamel.

Starting in 1936, it was decided that Australian plates were to be uniform in size and embossed using standard Australian dies, beginning with New South Wales, the Federal Capital Territory (now Australian Capital Territory) and Victoria. By 1956, the other states and territories had moved to standard Australian embossing using painted or enamelled metal, with dimensions of 372 mm (14.6 in) × 134 mm (5.3 in). The embossed Australian dies was standardised in all states and territories in 1954.

In the early 1950s, a uniform scheme for vehicle registration plates was developed, which was to apply across all states and territories. Previously, both New South Wales and Victoria had issued plates with two letters and three digits, in white on a black background. However, that was not entirely popular, and some states and territories preferred to have their own identity reflected on their registration plates.

The following scheme was meant to be implemented Australia-wide after 1952:

State or territory	Allocated blocks	Original format colours	Years	Actual issues	Notes
Australian Capital Territory & Jervis Bay Territory	YAA-000 to YZZ-999	YAA•000	1968–1998	YAA-000 to YZZ-999	Jervis Bay Territory original allocation YZO-000 to YZO-999, exhausted in 2013.
New South Wales	AAA-000 to FZZ-999	AAA·000	1951–2004	AAA-000 to ZLF-999	ISA-000 to ISZ-999 reserved for interstate vehicles.
Northern Territory	XAA-000 to XZZ-999	100·000	1931–2011	1 to 999–999	Xaa-nnn series never taken up. The NT kept six-digit plates until 2011. 800–000 to 899–999 were reserved for government.
Queensland	NAA-000 to QZZ-999	NAA·000	1955–1977	NAA-000 to QZZ-999	Started from N then P and issued O last. Q series reserved for trailers and QGx for the state government. Qld changed to 000-NAA from July 1977.
South Australia	RAA-000 to TZZ-999	RAA•000	1967–2008	RAA-000 to XUN-299	T-Series reserved for trailers.
Tasmania	WAA-000 to WZZ-999	WAA•000	1954–1970	WAA-000 to WZZ-999	From 1970 AA•0000 replaced the previous series.
Victoria	GAA-000 to MZZ-999	GAA·000	1953–2013	AAA-000 to ZZZ-999	IAA-000 to IZZ-999 was issued last before 1977 changeover to AAA-000. Skipped over to NAA-000 when FZZ-999 reached, M series reserved for government.
Western Australia	UAA-000 to VZZ-999	UAA·000	1956–1978	UAA-000 to UZZ-999 then XAA-000 to XZZ-999	White on a black background was initially proposed but was changed during implementation. Did not take up V series. 6AA-000 replaced from 1978 onwards until 9MZ-999 in 1997.

Western Australia deemed itself too large to fit into the proposed scheme and devised its own. Plates in the Iaa-nnn series were to be skipped, because as a capital I was believed to be easily mistaken for the number 1. That allowed the two populous states, with a greater number of registered vehicles, to be allocated a series of six letters series: New South Wales had A to F, Victoria had G to H, and J to M. Three other states had a series of three letters: Queensland had N, P and Q, South Australia had R to T, Western Australia had U and V. Due to its small size, Tasmania was only given one letter, W, the Australian Capital Territory was given Y and the Northern Territory was given the letter X. The letter Z was for Commonwealth government departmental use Australia-wide, the second letter reflecting the department. The letters I and O were deemed to be too similar to 1 and 0 and weren't part of the original scheme.

The system, introduced in 1951–52, was not as popular as expected. The Northern Territory declined to participate and continued its previous all-number system. Western Australia did adopt the scheme, taking XAA-000 to XZZ-999, previously allocated to the NT. WAG-000 to WAG-999 was reserved for WA Government vehicles, later extended to XZZ-999. However, many WA rural shires chose to issue their own plates, in the WA colour scheme, with the initial letters being the shire abbreviations, followed by digits.

All the other states and territories stuck to their initial allocations, until the number of registrations became too large for each state's allocation, so state authorities allowed their registration numbers to "overflow" into series allocated to another state. In 1972, NSW extended its numbering from FZZ-999 to GAA-000, which had been originally issued to Victoria. In 1974, Victoria, having reserved the Maa-nnn series for state government vehicle registrations, extended its numbering from LZZ-999 to IAA-000, with the letter I no longer being avoided. In 1977, it began using IZZ-999 to AAA-000, the latter originally allocated to NSW. South Australia did similar, extending from SZZ-999 to UAA-000, having reserved the Taa-nnn series for trailer registrations.

All states and territories have now adopted their own series, given that the grouped allocations from the 1950s have long since run out. Various combinations of letters and numbers are now used in each state.

=== Federal Interstate Registration Scheme ===
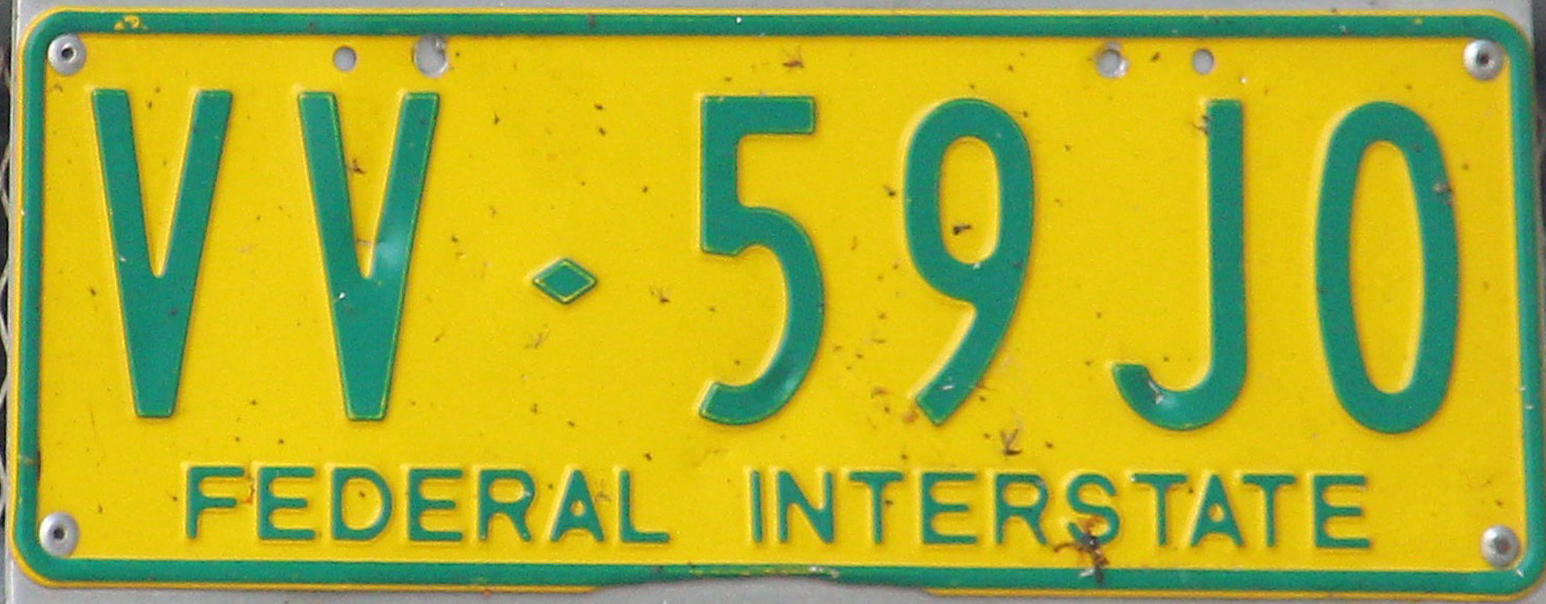
Federal Interstate

Run years: 1 January 1987 to 1 July 2018.

Heavy vehicles (over 4.5 tonnes GVM), can choose to participate in FIRS scheme.

FIRS plates are WX·00AA, and are green on a reflective yellow background.

FIRS plates are issued by state authorities on behalf of the Commonwealth, and carry the format as specified by the Interstate Road Transport Regulations 1986 – Reg 21. Federal Interstate-registered vehicles are prohibited from undertaking intrastate journeys and can only be used for cross-border work.

The first character represents the state of issue:

- A for Australian Capital Territory
- J for Jervis Bay Territory
- N for New South Wales
- C for Northern Territory
- Q for Queensland
- S for South Australia
- T for Tasmania
- V for Victoria
- W for Western Australia

The second character represents the type of vehicle being registered:

- V for vehicle (typically issued to prime-movers, but are also attached to rigid vehicles such as coaches and moving trucks).
- T for trailer.
- X for extra weight, for vehicles with particular high gross vehicle or aggregate trailer masses.

The remaining characters are allocated by the issuing authorities. As most interstate transport companies are based on the East Coast, the majority of FIRS plates are registered in NSW and VIC. Some issues originate in QLD or SA, with the remaining states appearing relatively rarely.

A typical plate which might be found on a semi-trailer, registered to a company in QLD would be QT·88MW.

ALL FIRS scheme plates ceased accepting renewals on 1 July 2018 and FIRS closed on 1 July 2019, after all FIRS registration expired and plates exchanged to the new National Heavy Vehicle scheme/state based registration plates.

More details are found under the Infrastructure website of the Federal Government's

=== National Heavy Vehicle Registration Scheme ===
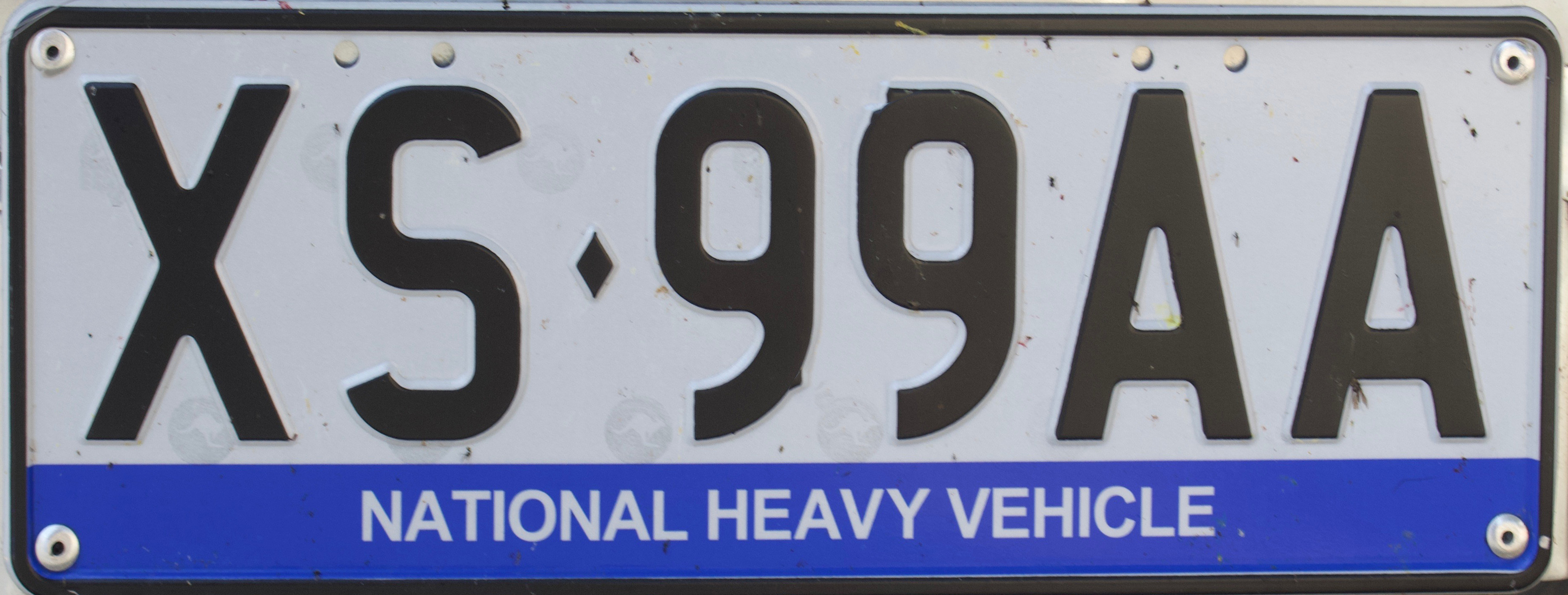
National Heavy Vehicle

Starting on 1 July 2018, a new system was implemented in New South Wales, Queensland, South Australian Capital Territory and Tasmania. Victoria joined the scheme on 1 October 2018.

Northern Territory started using National Heavy Vehicle Plates and abolished the rego stickers effective on 1 August 2019.

Western Australia is not participating, hence WA Heavy Vehicles are on state based plates.

The format now in use are:

FB-12AA in Black on white reflection base, and blue band legend with the words NATIONAL HEAVY VEHICLE imprinted on it.

XQ-12AA is for Trucks while YQ-12AA is for Trailers. In this example the prefix denotes X for Trucks and Y for Trailers and the last prefix letter is for home states/territory:

- A for Australian Capital Territory
- J for Jervis Bay Territory
- N, O and P for New South Wales
- R for Northern Territory
- Q, B and C for Queensland
- S for South Australia
- T for Tasmania
- V, W and X for Victoria

It replaced the state based general series, however not mandatory and owners can request state based personalised plates if they wish to have them. It applies to new heavy vehicles or heavy vehicle requiring replacement of state based general series plates. 4.5 GVM minimum must qualify for the new plates.

=== Debate about registration on bicycle riders ===
For many years in Australia they have had a debate about should registration be also on bicycle riders.

In 2014, Randwick councillor Charles Matthews proposed to impose a $50 registration fee on bicycle riders, which would be used to help fund cycleways being built by the council. This proposal was rejected by other councillors. In 2014, the Victorian council of City of Bayside tried a same proposal.

== Common features ==
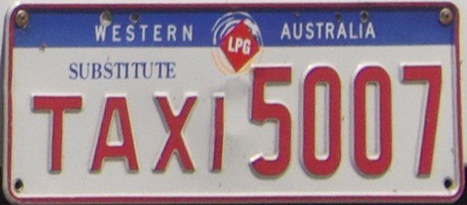
LPG

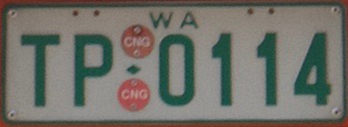
CNG

Metal diamond with a white lettering on a retro-reflective red background or metal disc

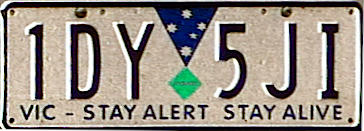
Hybrid sticker on a Victorian registered car

Plates tend to bear the State or Territory name and perhaps a state motto or slogan at the top and/or bottom of the plate. Recent issues of plates (since the 1980s) also often use the state's colours and may include some imagery related to the state (such as the state's logo as the sequence separator).

=== Alternative fuel vehicle identification ===
Under Part 10 of the Australian Light Vehicle Standards Rules 2015, vehicles powered by fuels other than petrol or diesel (collectively alternative fuel systems) must always display a specific plate that is affixed to both the front and rear number plates. These labels exist to assist emergency services personnel in responding to potential hazards involving such vehicles. Generally, such labels are applied permanently to the registration plate by way of pop rivets or other mechanical fixtures.

The standards were updated in March 2019, to add standards for hydrogen and electric powered vehicles.

Alternative fuel system	Defining standard	Required number plate label
Liquid petroleum gas (built or converted pre AS 1425)	Australian Light Vehicle Standards Rules 2015	The letters "LPGAS" or "LPG" atop a red background, on a plate no smaller than 25mm high and 25mm wide.
Liquid petroleum gas (built or converted post AS 1425)	AS 1425	Four pointed red diamond, with the letters "LPG".
Natural gas (CNG, LNG)	AS 2739	Red circle, with the letters "CNG" or"LNG".
Hydrogen-powered vehicles (post 1 January 2019)	Australian Light Vehicle Standards Rules 2015	Yellow pentagon, with the letter "H" in the middle.
Electric-powered vehicles (post 1 January 2019)	Australian Light Vehicle Standards Rules 2015	Blue triangle with a silver border, with the letters "EV" in the middle.

LPG, LNG or CNG vehicles with more than one tank of that type are required to have one additional diamond attached to the front and back number plates.

==== Labelling for pre 1 January 2019 hydrogen or electric vehicles ====
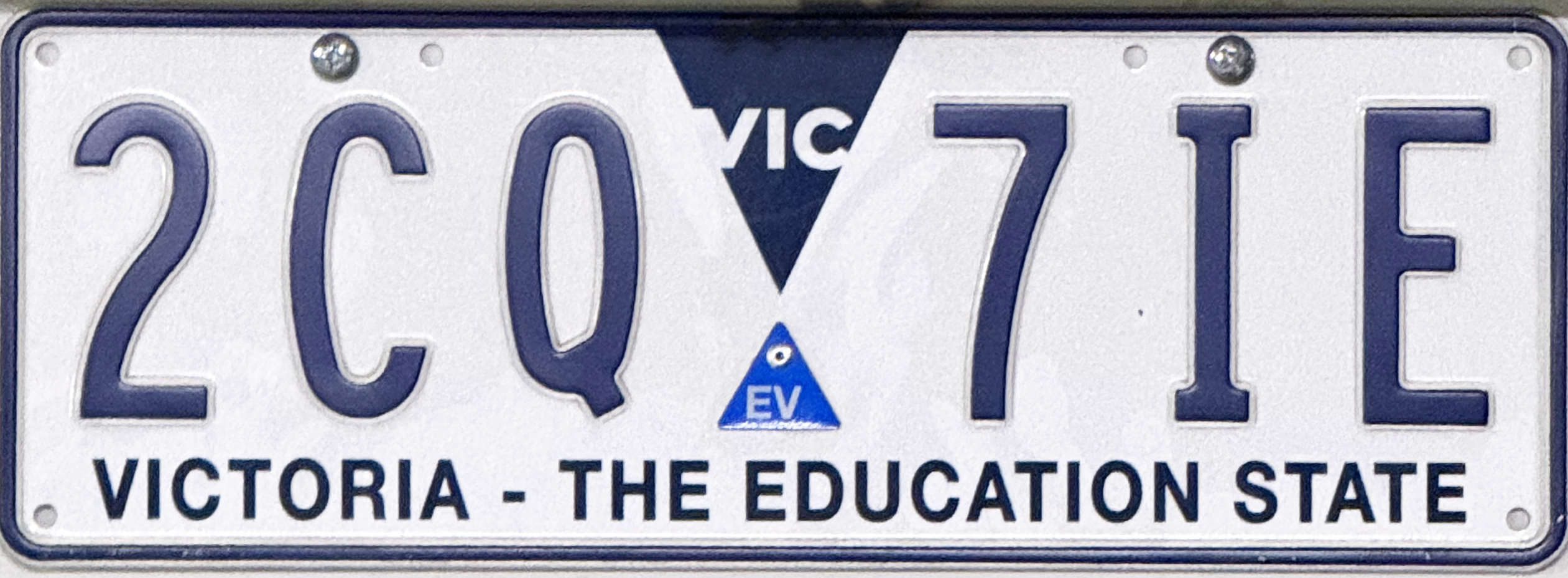
EV sticker on a Victorian licence plate. Registered to a Hyundai Kona Hybrid so as a hybrid vehicle it is required to show the sticker

Hydrogen or electric powered vehicles built or converted before 1 January 2019 are still subject to relevant state-based standards for their labelling. For example in Victoria, all electric-powered vehicles (including hybrid vehicles) need to display "EV" number plate labels on both number plates. Electric-powered passenger cars and hybrid vehicles registered before 4 October 2020 were required to display a different style of label.

== Commonwealth and military ==
Military plates were nnn-nnn with the first digit corresponding to the military district number:

- 1 – Australian Capital Territory
- 2 – New South Wales
- 3 – Victoria
- 4 – Queensland
- 5 – South Australia
- 6 – Western Australia
- 7 – Tasmania
- 8 – Northern Territory

However, new plates issued to the Army are now in this format: nn-nnnn, where the first two digits represent the year the vehicle was registered, e.g. 05-1832.

Current Australian Army registration plate format is Annnnn with this newer format beginning in 2003. The A represents "Army" with the next two digits representing the year the vehicle was first registered. For instance, a 2008 model Toyota Coaster used to transport army cadets might have the plate A08227. This format has also been adopted by the Defence Force, Navy, and Air Force with combinations Dnnnnn, Nnnnnn and Rnnnnn respectively.

The official car of Chief of the Defence Force carries plates ADF1 and official cars for the three service chiefs carry plates ARMY1, NAVY1 or RAAF1.

The Commonwealth Government of Australia used the Z prefix for its government owned vehicles up until 2000 when the Commonwealth Vehicle Registry was closed.

These plates were on a black on white background, usually marked with "C of A" at the top of the plate – an abbreviation of Commonwealth of Australia and the leading Z being red to further distinguish it from other state plates.

Issuance of Z prefixed plates used for same purposes was passed onto the states after 2000. Australian Capital Territory plates started at ZYA-000, Victoria plates started at ZED-000, Queensland plates started at ZQ-0000, New South Wales plates started at ZZZ-000, South Australia plates started at ZSA-000, Western Australia plates started at ZAA-00F and Tasmania plates started at ZTA-000. Only New South Wales and Victoria chose to use their state base colours rather than the standard black on reflective white, with the use of red embossed Z prefix.

Each of the states display their state initials as seen above the numbers instead of the old "C of A" legend.

The Northern Territory still uses the older format and same "C of A" legend at top of the plate.

The registration plate of the Prime Ministerial Limousine was C*1 (i.e. Commonwealth No. 1) with a seven-pointed Commonwealth Star. This was updated on 11 November 2015, showing C (Australian Government crest image) 1. Other Commonwealth fleet cars for official transport carry "C of A" plates in the form C-nnn.

The Governor-General's official cars do not carry registration plates, but until the accession of King Charles III simply depiced a representation of the St Edward's Crown. These vehicles now display the Tudor Crown. If the Governor-General is aboard, they usually fly the Governor-General’s flag. Similar plates were used for vehicles carrying Queen Elizabeth II when she visited Australia.

Cars owned by the government have special number plates, some also have a crown and symbols.

For official visits to Australia, special plates are often put over the top of normal "Z" plates, depicting the Australian Coat of Arms and, in red "Visit to Australia" with a numeral. These are not strictly registration plates, but are useful for police and other officials to identify cars in official motorcades.

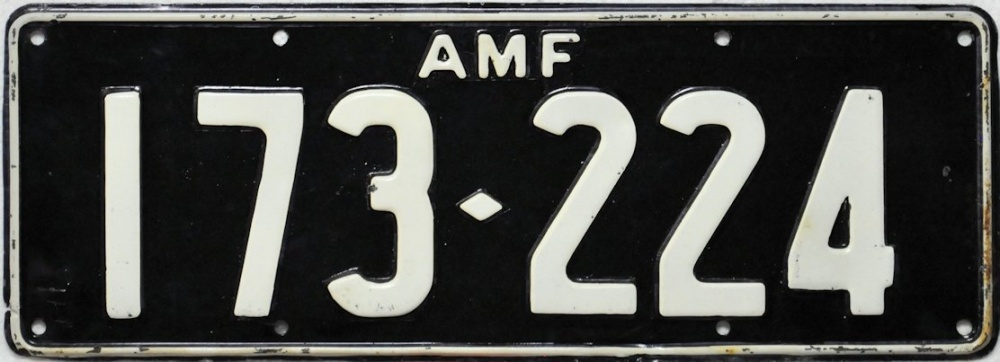
Australian Military Forces number plate. Issued to Australian Army vehicles until 1972

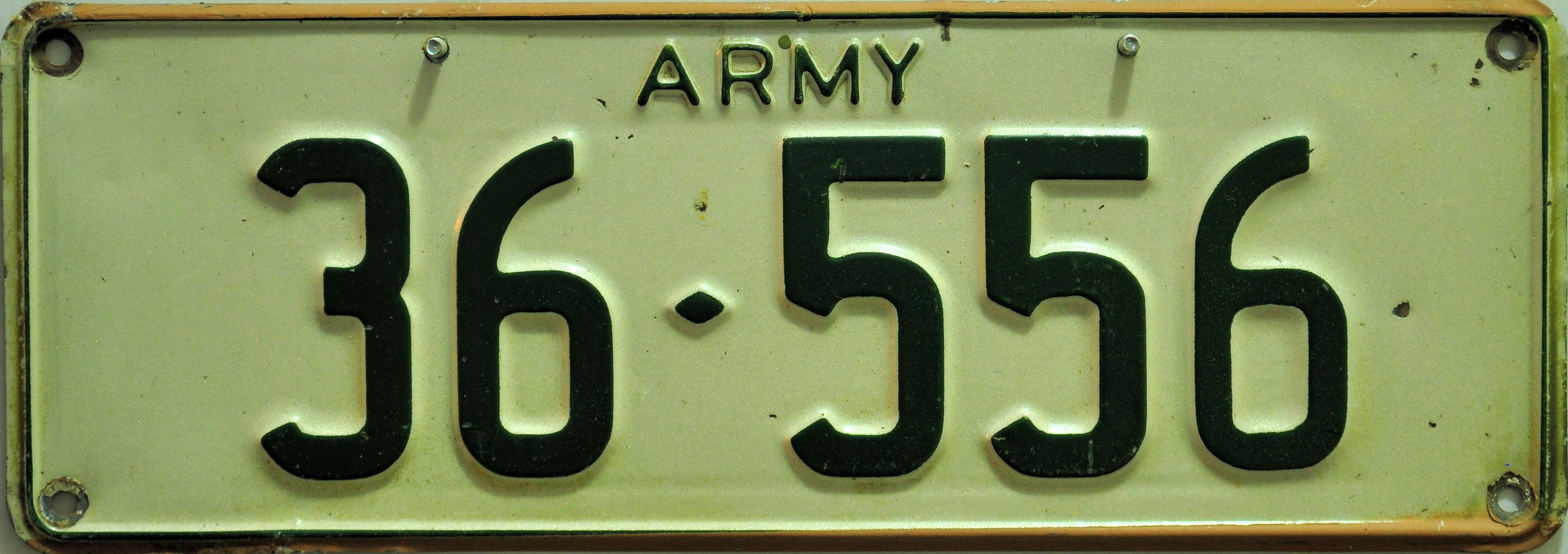
Latter style number plate used on Army vehicles from 1972.

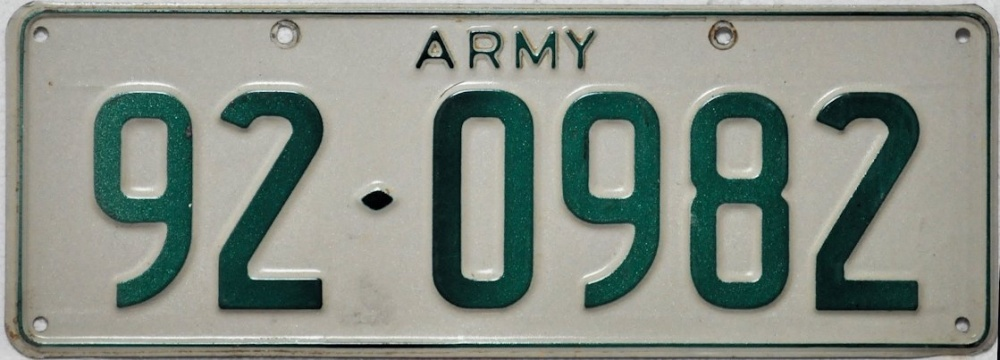
From 1989 to 2002, Army plates included a "Date of Purchase" prefix. In this example, 1992.

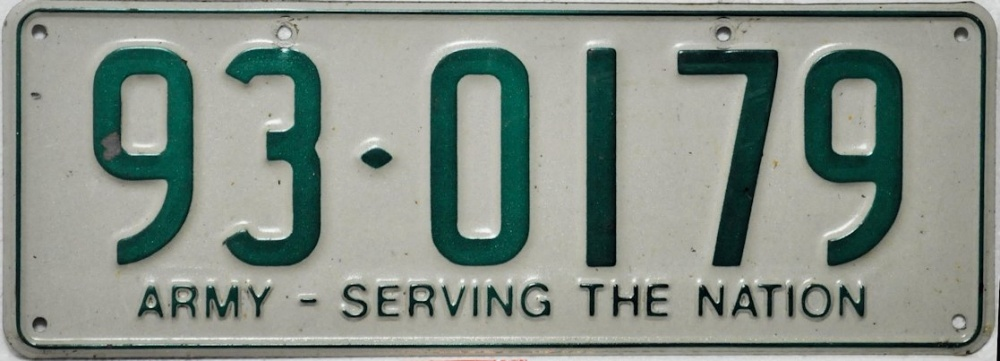
From 1989 to 2002, Army plates included a "Date of Purchase" prefix. Starting in 1993, a slogan was added.

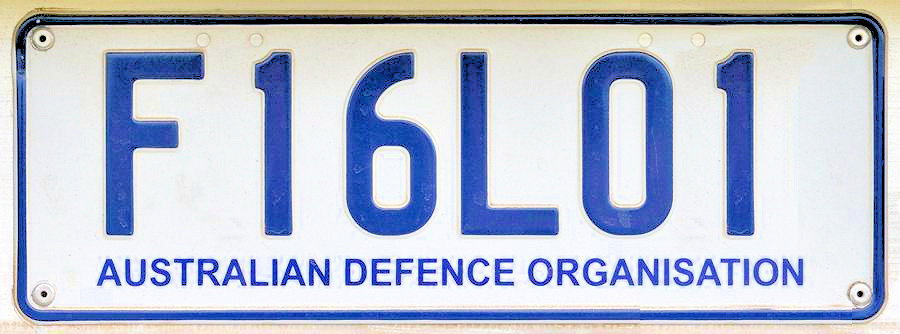
Australian Defence Organisation registration plate.The F prefix denotes Forklift

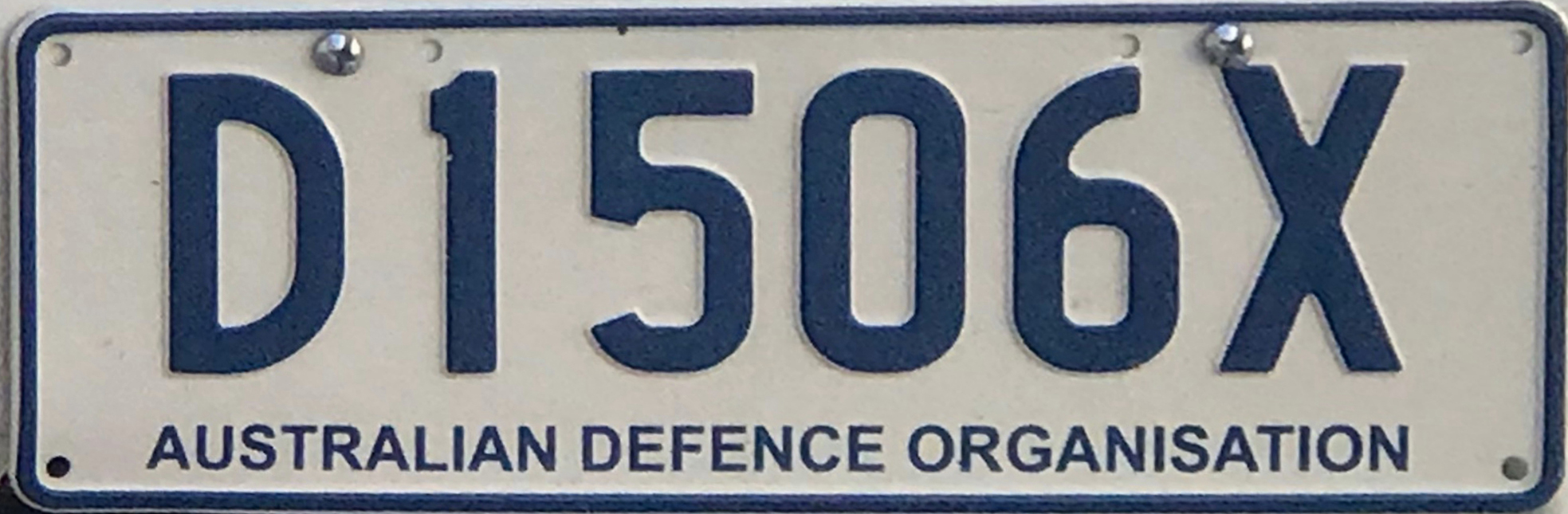
Defence Force

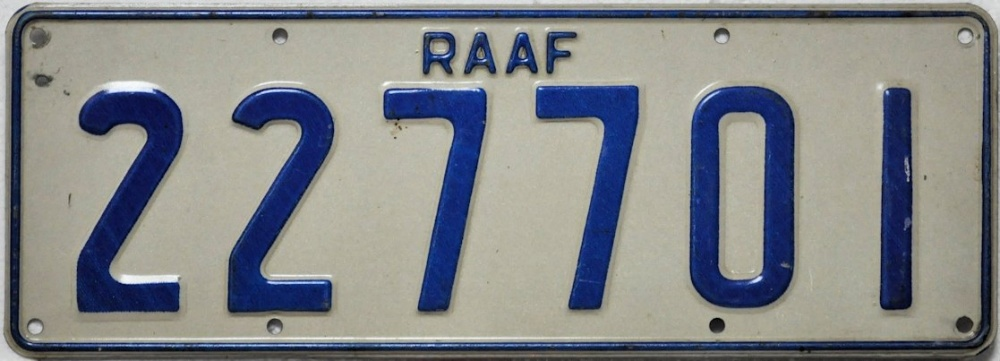
This style of number plate was used by Royal Australian Air Force vehicles from about 1971 to 2000

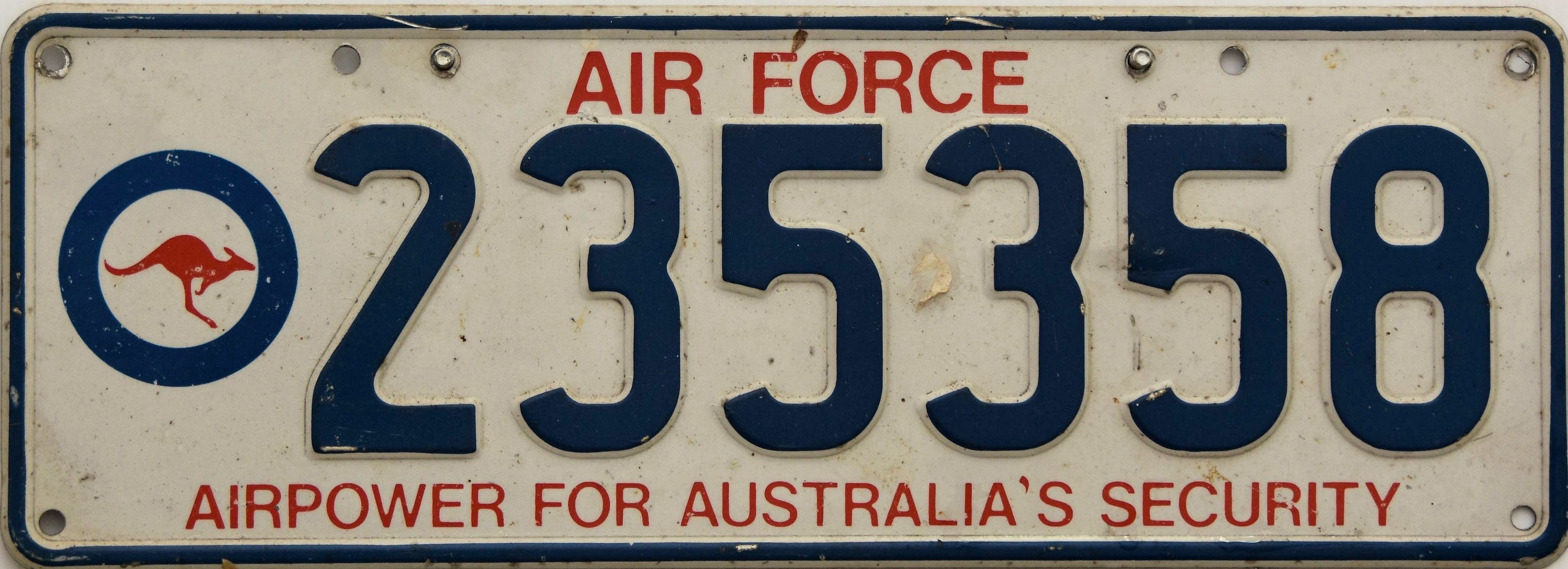
RAAF number plate. this style was introduced in about 1993.

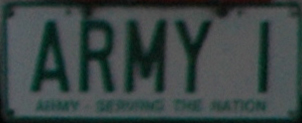
Chief of Army plate

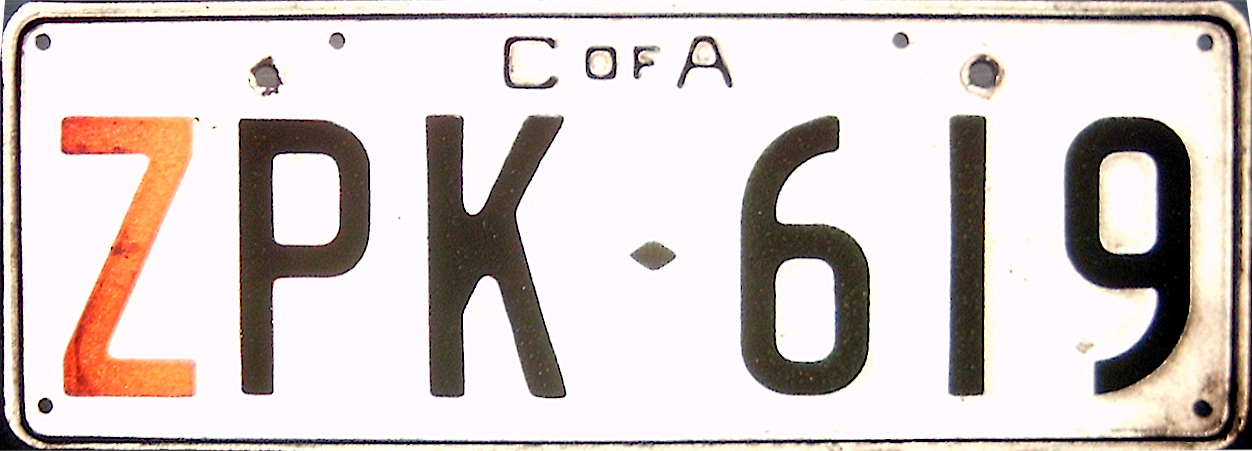
Commonwealth of Australia

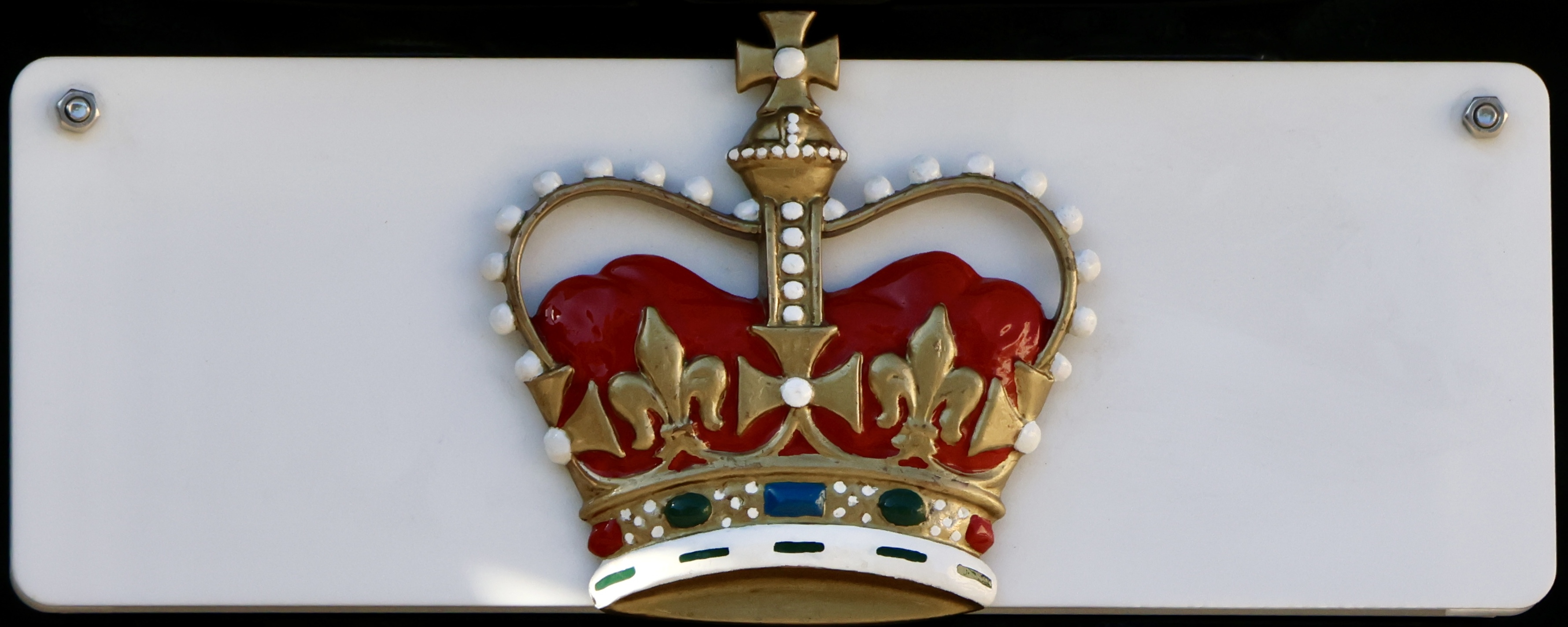
St Edward's Crown plate (Governor General)

Prime Ministerial C*1 plate

== Diplomatic ==
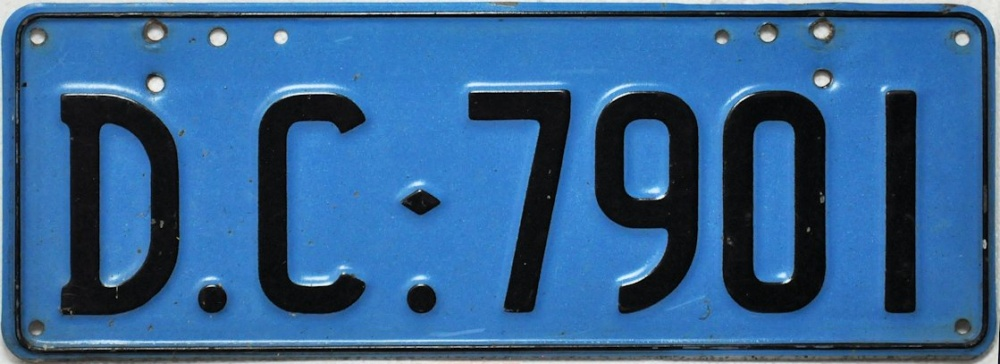
Diplomatic Corps number plate from the Ambassador of Greece in the current colour scheme.

Diplomatic plates are issued to foreign diplomats by the Government of the Australian Capital Territory. They would formerly grant diplomatic immunity to the vehicle and driver from all traffic laws, speed limits, parking infringements and tolls in all reasonable course of duty by a diplomatic officer, in compliance with international treaty, but this is no longer the case. They follow the format of "DC nnnn", "DCnnnnn", "DX nnnn" or "DXnnnnn", where the first two or three numbers are the code for the home country of the diplomat, and have black text on a powder blue background. DC plates are issued to members of the diplomatic corps, whereas DX plates are issued to persons who are attached to diplomatic missions but are not themselves diplomats, e.g. household staff.

Older issues have no territory identifier, however newer plates have "ACT" embossed at the top centre of the plate. Newer plates are also written as "DC" and "DX", rather than "D.C." and "D.X." to allow for the inclusion of a greater number of characters in the sequence. A substantial number of older-style plates are still in use, however.

The first two or three numbers appearing in the plate correspond to a specific country, for example 69 is issued to the United Kingdom. The following two digits are typically issued with lower numbers to higher-ranking officials, usually 01 being issued to the ambassador from that country. So DC 6901 would be found on the vehicle of the British High Commissioner to Australia.

The number issued to each country has no particular relevance, and was allocated by ballot. Countries with many vehicles (such as the USA) are allocated two numbers. Before the blue D.C. plates were introduced, diplomatic cars in Canberra carried plates which had white letters on red.

The numbers then correlated to the length of time the particular diplomatic mission had been in Canberra and the British High Commissioner's car carried the plate D.C.1 The replacement arrangement is more egalitarian.

State registration authorities issue CC plates to consular representatives in their relevant state capital.

The ACT Government issues similar plates to representatives of international organisations in the Territory. These plates are also coloured black on powder blue, and follow a format of IO nnnn.

== Registration labels abolition ==
All other states have abolished registration labels for light and heavy vehicles:

=== Light vehicles ===
- Western Australia – 1 January 2010, beginning with light vehicles is the first to be abolished and in Queensland is the last to be abolished from 1 October 2014 for Light Vehicles.

=== Heavy vehicles ===
- Western Australia – 1 July 2016, beginning with heavy vehicles is the first to be abolished and in Northern Territory is the last to be abolished from 1 August 2019 for Heavy Vehicles.

== See also ==
- Vehicle registration plates of the Australian Capital Territory
- Vehicle registration plates of New South Wales
- Vehicle registration plates of the Northern Territory
- Vehicle registration plates of Queensland
- Vehicle registration plates of South Australia
- Vehicle registration plates of Tasmania
- Vehicle registration plates of Victoria
- Vehicle registration plates of Western Australia
- Vehicle registration plates of Christmas Island
- Vehicle registration plates of Norfolk Island
