= Vehicle registration plates of Western Australia =

Western Australian vehicle license plates

The state of Western Australia requires its residents to register their motor vehicles and display vehicle registration plates. Current regular issue plates are to the standard Australian dimensions of 372 mm (14.6 in) in length by 134 mm (5.3 in) in height, and use standard Australian serial dies.

As well as issuing general number plates, Western Australia also issues plates specific to the state's local government areas (LGAs). LGA specific plates can only be requested by vehicle owners who are resident within these LGAs. Western Australia also has a plate series for vehicles designated for off-road use only.

== Issuing authorities ==
- Department for Planning & Infrastructure: early 2000s to 2009
- Department of Transport: 2009–2025
- Department of Transport & Major Infrastructure: 2025 –

== General plates ==
- Starting in the 1950s, WA released the U series plates, which commenced in a six character white-on-black design (example: UAA·000) and changed during their release to be of an inverted black-on-cream design (example: UZZ·999) as would be seen continued in the release of the X-series plates (example: XAA·000). The letters "Q" and "V" were not issued in any combinations, due to these being easily mistaken for "O" or "0" and "U", "Q" was only used by Government of Western Australia departments. The X-series and U-series plates are now available again by request, as "retro" plates in either black-on-white, or white-on-black. UQB·nnn was reserved for Transperth buses with three-digit registration numbers usually corresponding to the bus fleet numbers. Since June 1990, Transperth buses have been issued green on white plates in the TP·nnnn range. Other government vehicles also used "Q" as the second character until the new series in 1997.
- In October 1978, having exhausted the XAA – XZZ series a new series was released commencing at 6AA·000. The format used was black on yellow (example: 6AA·000), where the numbers preceding the letters ranged between 6 and 9. This series ended at 9MZ·999 and the trailer series ended at 9RZ·999. As of February 2025, The Department of Transport has now reintroduced the old 6,7,8 & 9 series marketed as Nostalgia Series.
- The current standard issue series is blue on white, with an extra letter added to create a seven character registration plate standard (example: 1AAA·000). Introduced in September 1997, it commenced with the characters 1AAA·000, estimated at the time to reach 1ZZZ·999 in 2137. The "1F" allocation has been reserved for silver-on-black slimline plates, (372mm in length by 100mm in depth) sold as platinum plates that were first issued in May 2016. As of October 2026, the "1JDA-000" sequence was being issued.
- Government issued vehicles use the "1Q" series, with inverted colours (white characters on a blue background).
- New car dealerships use the “1ZZ” series for new, pre-registered vehicles.
- Hire vehicles can use the "1Y" series, but is not compulsory.
- Privately owned buses or designated school buses use the current series.
- Commercially operated buses and coaches carried red on white TC·nnnn (touring coach) plates. These were introduced in 1984. Commencing in July 2016 these were recalled to be replaced with CVL·nnnn (Charter Vehicle) plates.
- TAXI·nnnn plates are used for taxicabs. Originally in red on white and now into black on white non perpetual taxi plates.
- CT·nnnn plates are used for taxis outside of the metropolitan area (Perth).
- Limousines carry the plate SCV·nnn, SCV·nnnn and also use 1SCV·nnn, this is being withdrawn from the end of April 2017 and replaced with CVL−nnnn (Charter Vehicle).
- Private Taxi PT·123 issued to private taxis that this is being withdrawn from the end of April 2017 and replaced with CVL−nnnn (Charter Vehicle).
- Motorcycles have the plate 1AA·nnn (e.g.: 1AB·123).As of October 2025, The plate base switched from a longer size to standard Aussie motorcycle size starting from 1RA-000 onwards. 1LO-999 is the last issued in this old size.
- Stock Carrying Trucks have 'ST' as the second & third letters of the prefix; e.g., 6ST·123, 9ST·123, 1STA·123.
- Trailers, caravans etc. have 1Taa·nnn or 1Uaa·nnn (e.g.: 1TAB·123, 1UAB·123). Earlier series used 'R', 'S', 'T', 'U', 'W' and 'X' as the second character for trailers (e.g. 9RA·123, 8UA·123, 7WA·123, 6TA·123, XUA·123, UUU·123). Country Shire/Town trailer plates follow the normal shire prefix system, but only one plate is issued, some shires have a block of numbers for trailers, others issue the next available number.
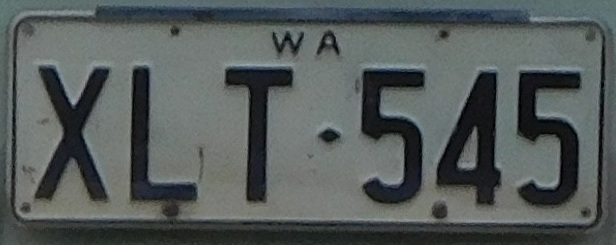
Pre-1978 standard series

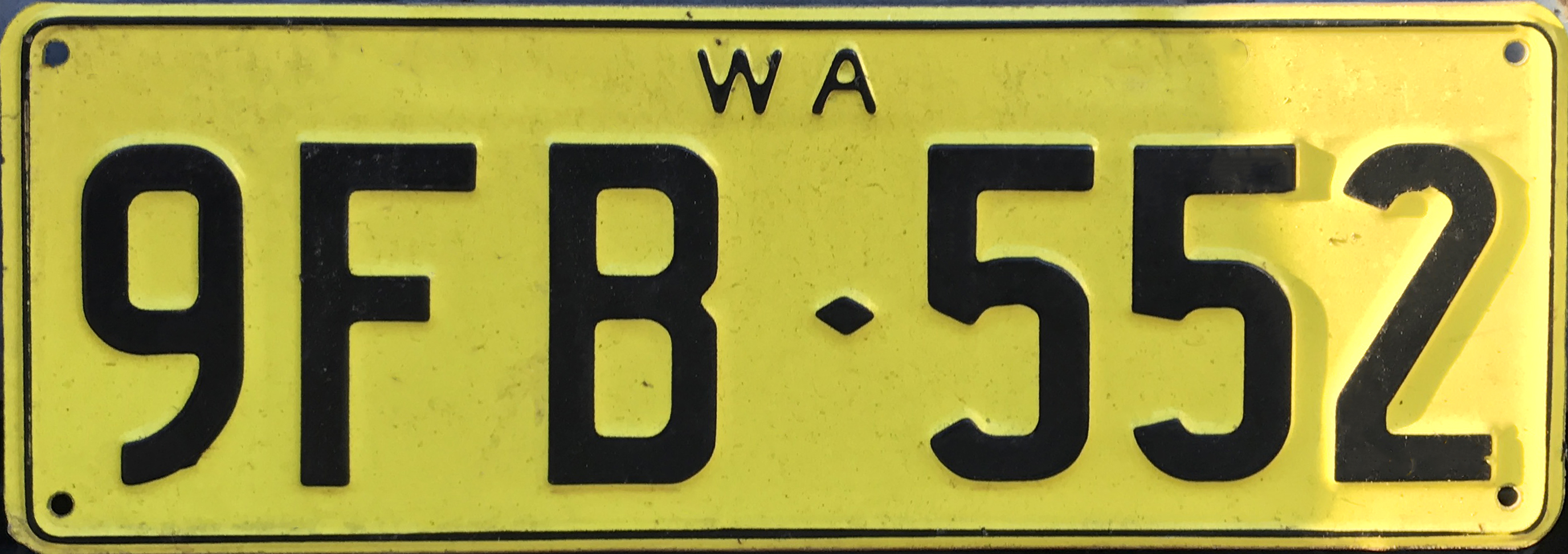
Standard issue (without slogan), 1978–1997

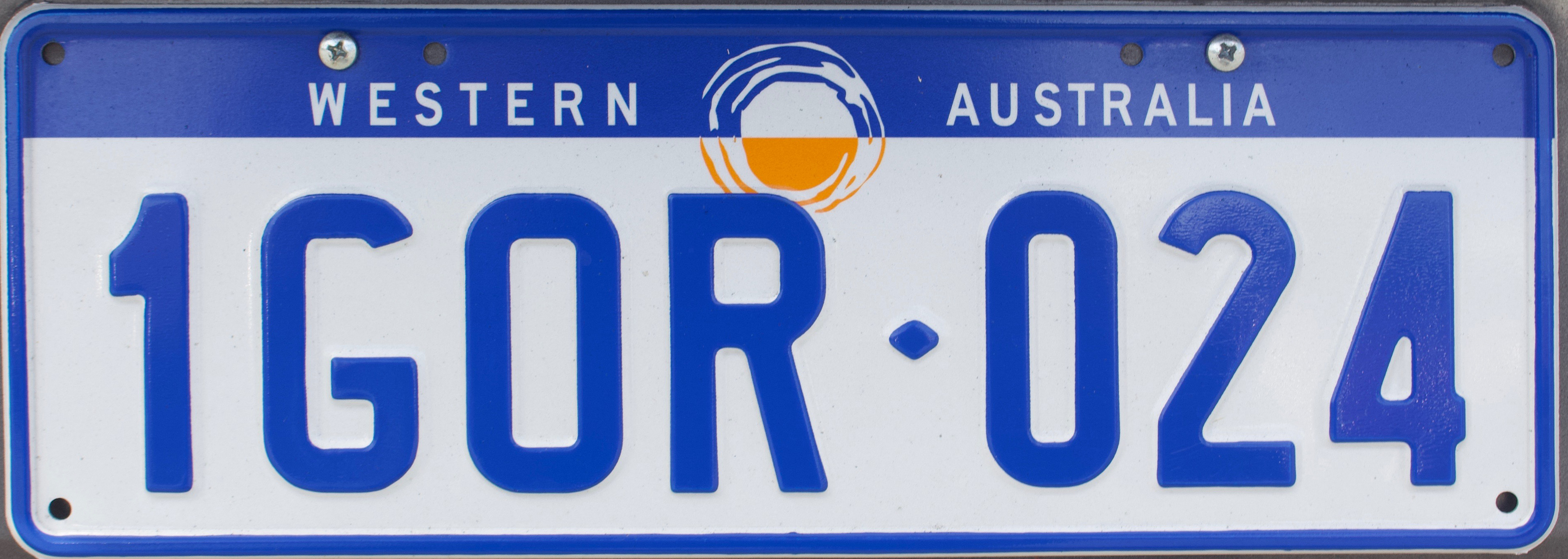
Standard issue, 1997–present

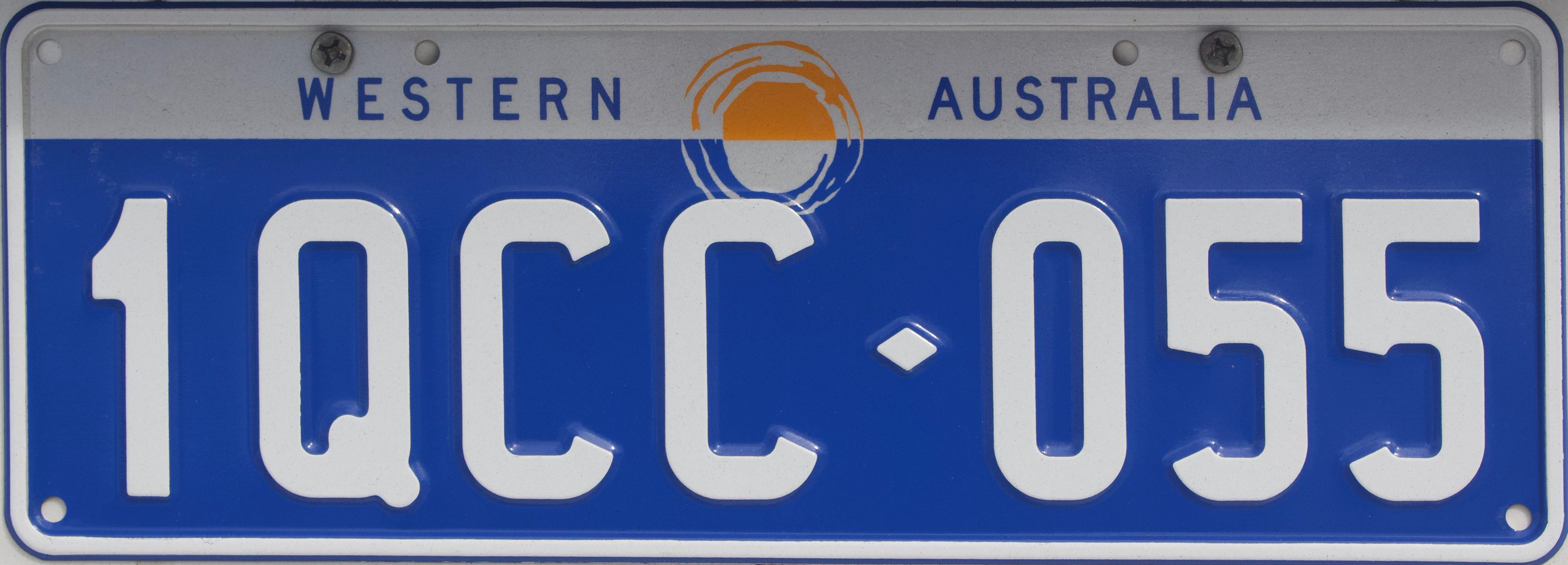
Standard issue government, 1997–present

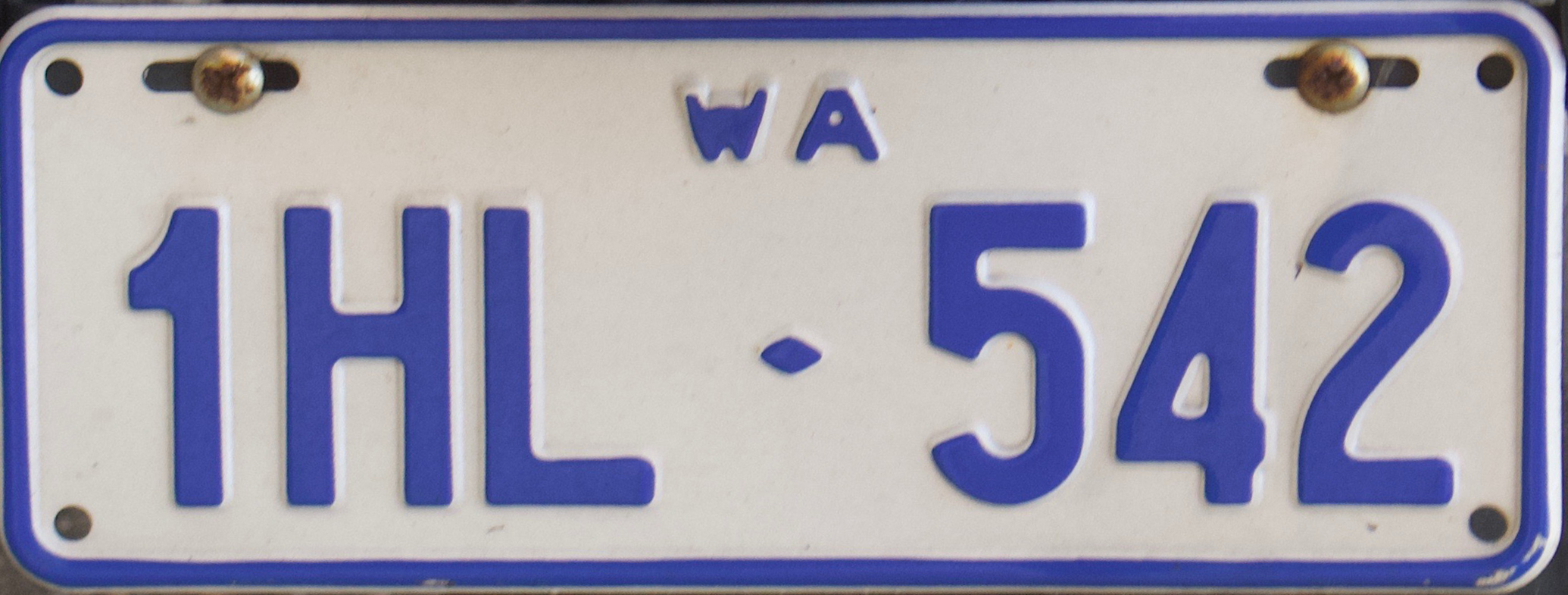
Standard issue motorcycle, 1997–present

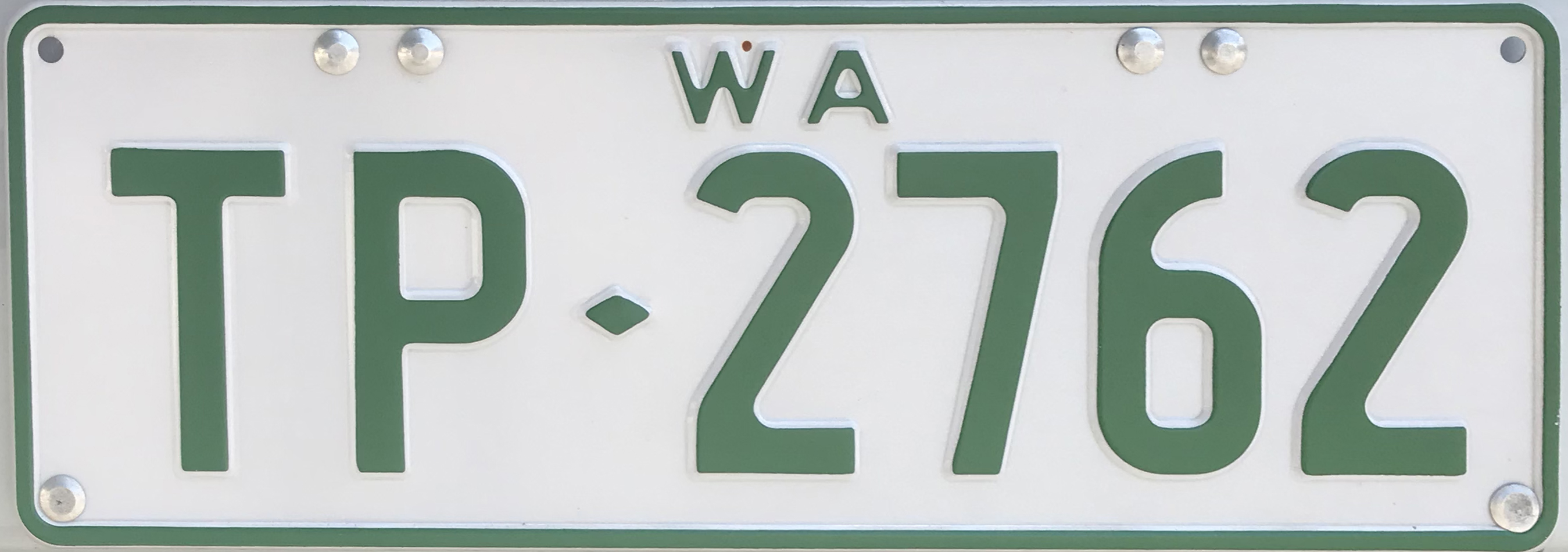
Transperth

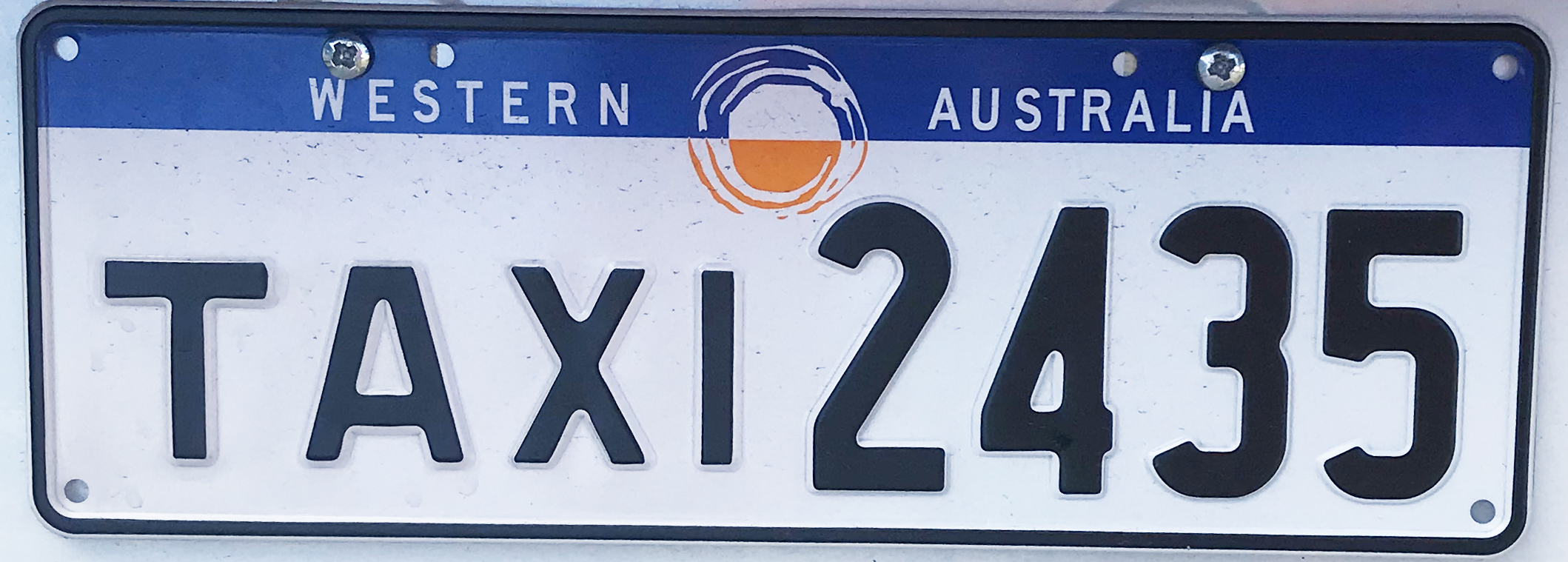
Black on White Taxi plate

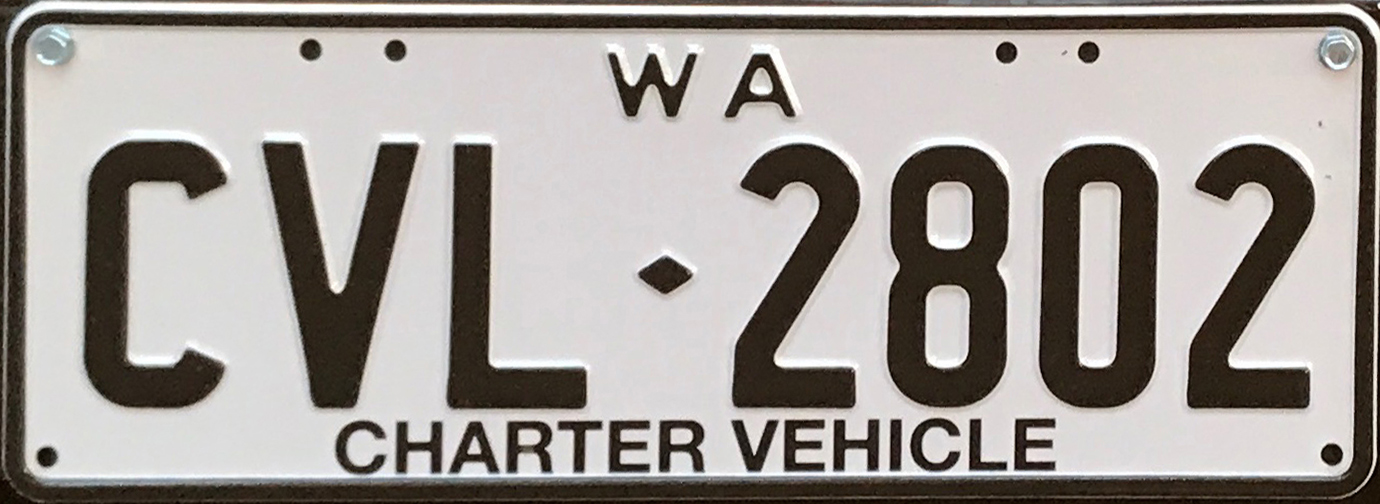
Charter vehicle

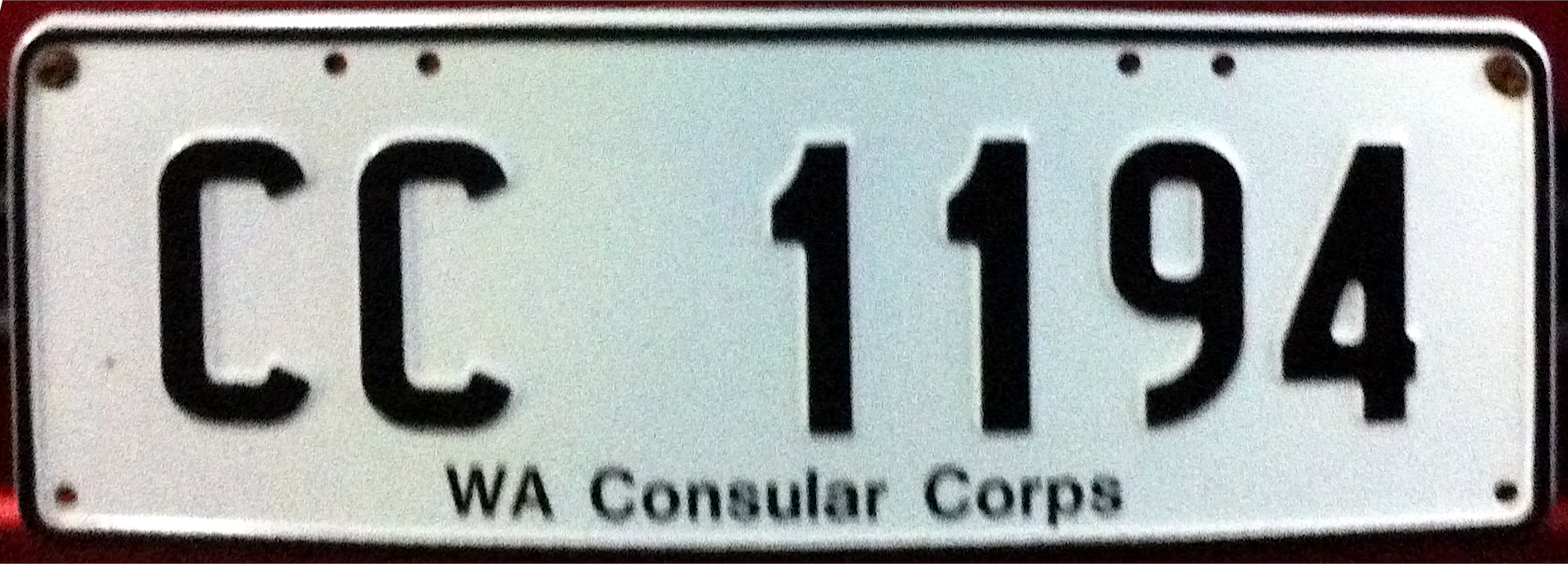
Consular Corps

== Outside metropolitan Perth ==
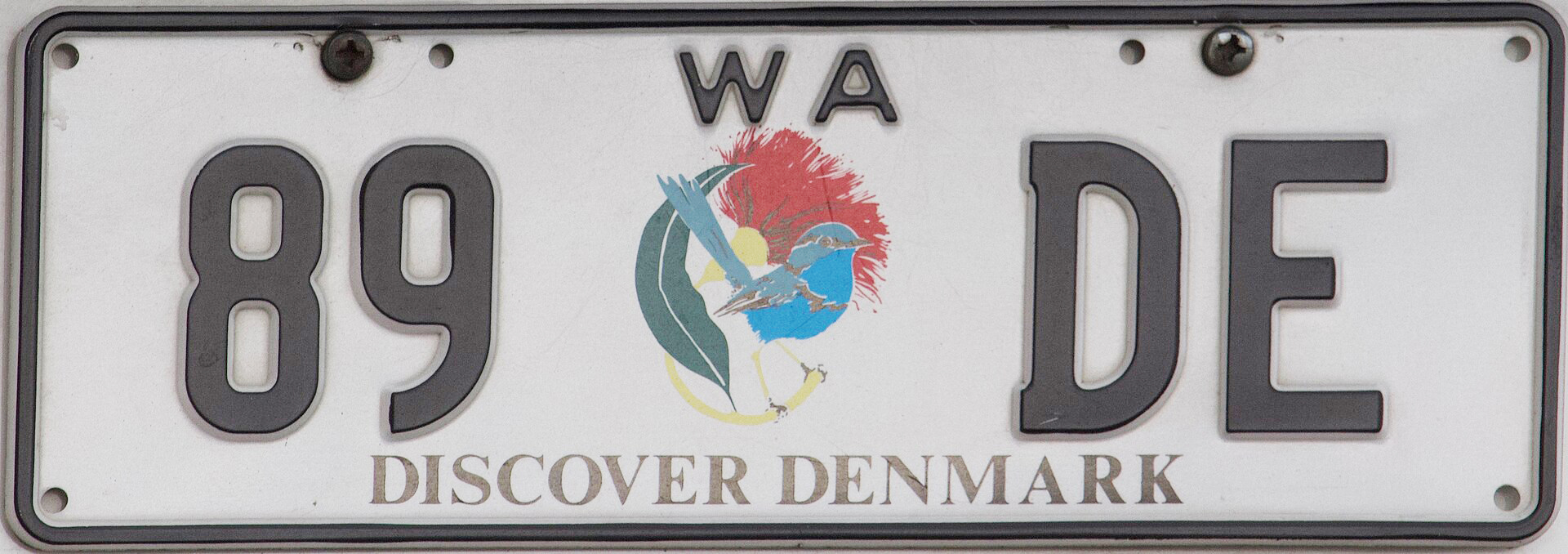
Denmark regional plate 1990–2000

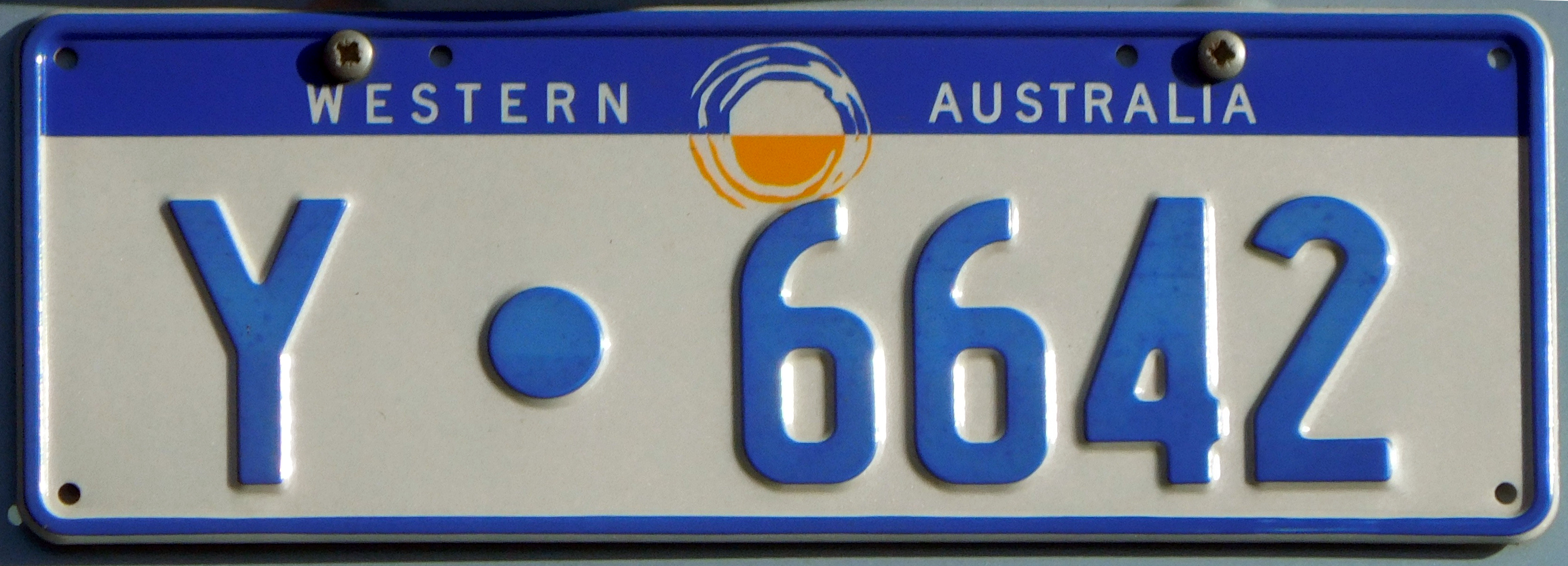
York regional plate 2000–present

Many of the 137 shire and town councils issue number plates using the form "loc·n" (for shires) and "loc n" (for towns or cities) – for example, "A nnnn" would be a plate issued by the City of Albany, while "AU·nnnn" would be issued by the Shire of Augusta Margaret River. A full list was published in StreetSmart street directories, published by Landgate and its predecessors. Special number plate versions for cities, shires and towns have been made available to purchase. They are in the format "nnn*loc" with the city, shire, or town crest between the numbers and letters.

In recent years towns within shires have been allocated number plates. Examples include "FR·nnn" for Frankland in the Shire of Cranbrook and "KND·nnn" for Kendenup in the Shire of Plantagenet.

Registration districts
Letter	LGA
A	Albany
AK	Armadale-Kelmscott
AL	Albany
AS	Ashburton
AU	Augusta
AW	Arthur West
B	Bridgetown
BD	Boulder
BE	Beverley
BH	Broomehill
BK	Bruce Rock
BM	Broome
BO	Brookton
BSN	Busselton
BT	Boddington
BU	Blackwood Upper
BY	Bunbury
C	Carnarvon
CA	Carnamah
CB	Cranbrook
CD	Cue
CG	Coolgardie
CH	Chittering
CM	Cunderdin-Meckering
CN	Cuballing
CO	Collie
CP	Capel
CR	Corrigin
CV	Chapman Valley
CW	Coorow
D	Dowerin
DA	Dardanup
DB	Donnybrook
DE	Denmark
DL	Dalwallinu
DN	Dandaragan
DS	Dundas
DU	Dumbleyung
E	Esperance
EP	East Pilbara
EX	Exmouth
GNG	Geraldton-Greenough
GG	Gingin
GO	Goomalling
GU	Gascoyne Upper
H	Harvey
HC	Halls Creek
IR	Irwin
JP	Jerramungup
KA	Katanning
KBC	Kalgoorlie-Boulder
KD	Koorda
KE	Kellerberrin
KM	Kalamunda
KMC	Kalgoorlie
KN	Kondinin
KO	Kojonup
KT	Kent
KTY	Trayning-Yelbeni
KU	Kulin
KW	Kimberley West
KWN	Kwinana
L	Leonora
LA	Laverton
LG	Lake Grace
M	Moora
MA	Mount Magnet
MBL	Mukinbudin
MD	Merredin
MDG	Mundaring
MH	Mandurah
MI	Mingenew
MK	Meekatharra
MM	Mount Marshall
MN	Menzies
MO	Morawa
MU	Murchison
MW	Mullewa
MY	Murray
N	Northam
NA	Nungarin
NB	Narembeen
NGN	Narrogin
NO	Narrogin
NP	Nannup
NR	Northampton
PH	Port Hedland
PJ	Perenjori
PL	Plantagenet
PN	Pingelly
Q	Quairading
R	Roebourne
RA	Ravensthorpe
RO	Rockingham
S	Sandstone
SB	Shark Bay
SJ	Serpentine-Jarrahdale
SW	Swan
T	Toodyay
TA	Tambellup
TB	Tableland
TN	Tammin
TS	Three Springs
VP	Victoria Plains
W	Wagin
WA	Manjimup
WB	Wongan-Ballidu
WD	Wandering
WK	Wickepin
WL	Williams
WM	Wyalkatchem
WN	Wanneroo
WO	Woodanilling
WP	West Pilbara
WR	Waroona
WT	Westonia
WU	Wiluna
WY	Wyndham
Y	York
YA	Yalgoo
YL	Yilgarn

== Other general and optional plates ==
Western Australia also offers the largest number of characters in a personalised registration plate, offering up to nine characters. Western Australian government plates are the same pattern as standard issue, however colours are inverted.

From 6SS·000 in 1984, the slogan WA Home of the America's Cup was introduced. This was replaced in 1987 by WA The Golden State. Slogans were abandoned in the early 1990s.

Slogans

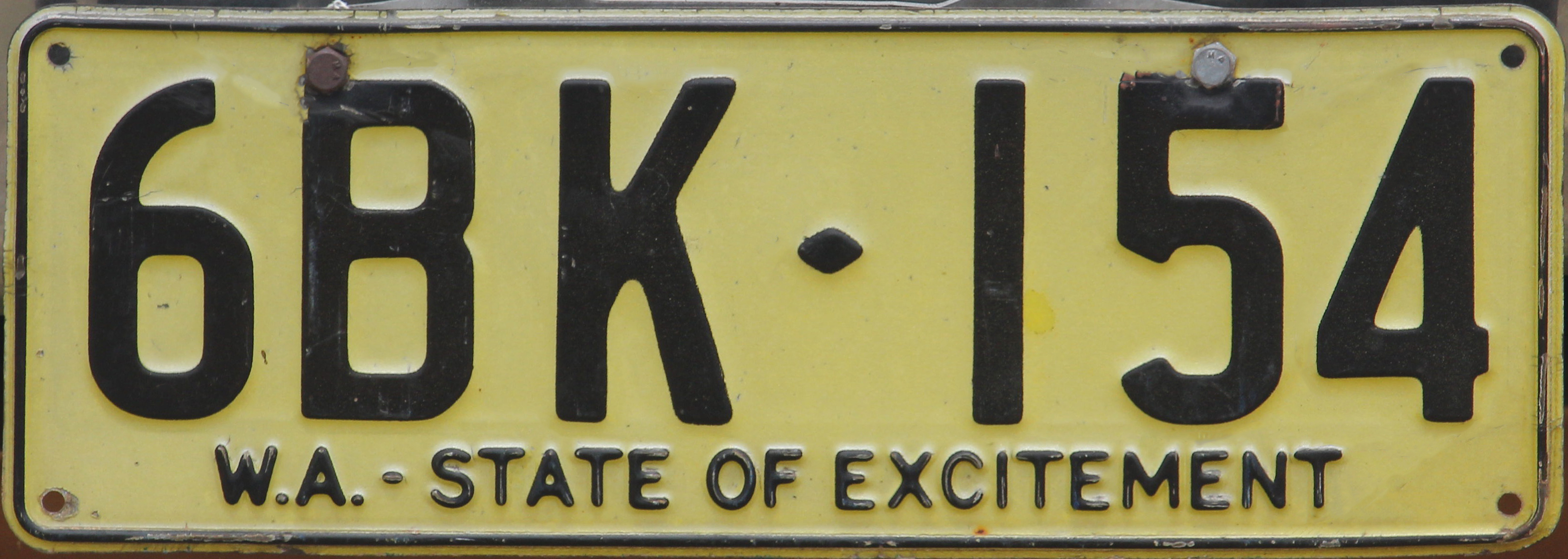
WA State of Excitement

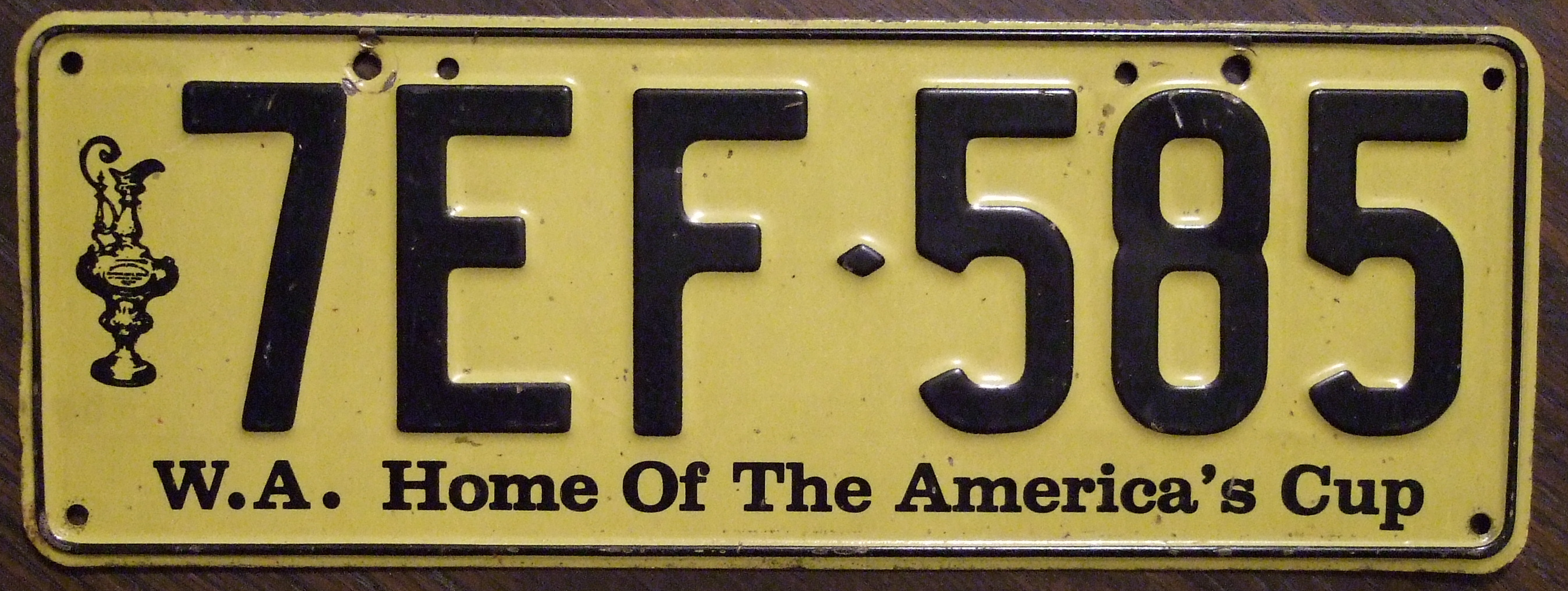
WA Home of the America's Cup

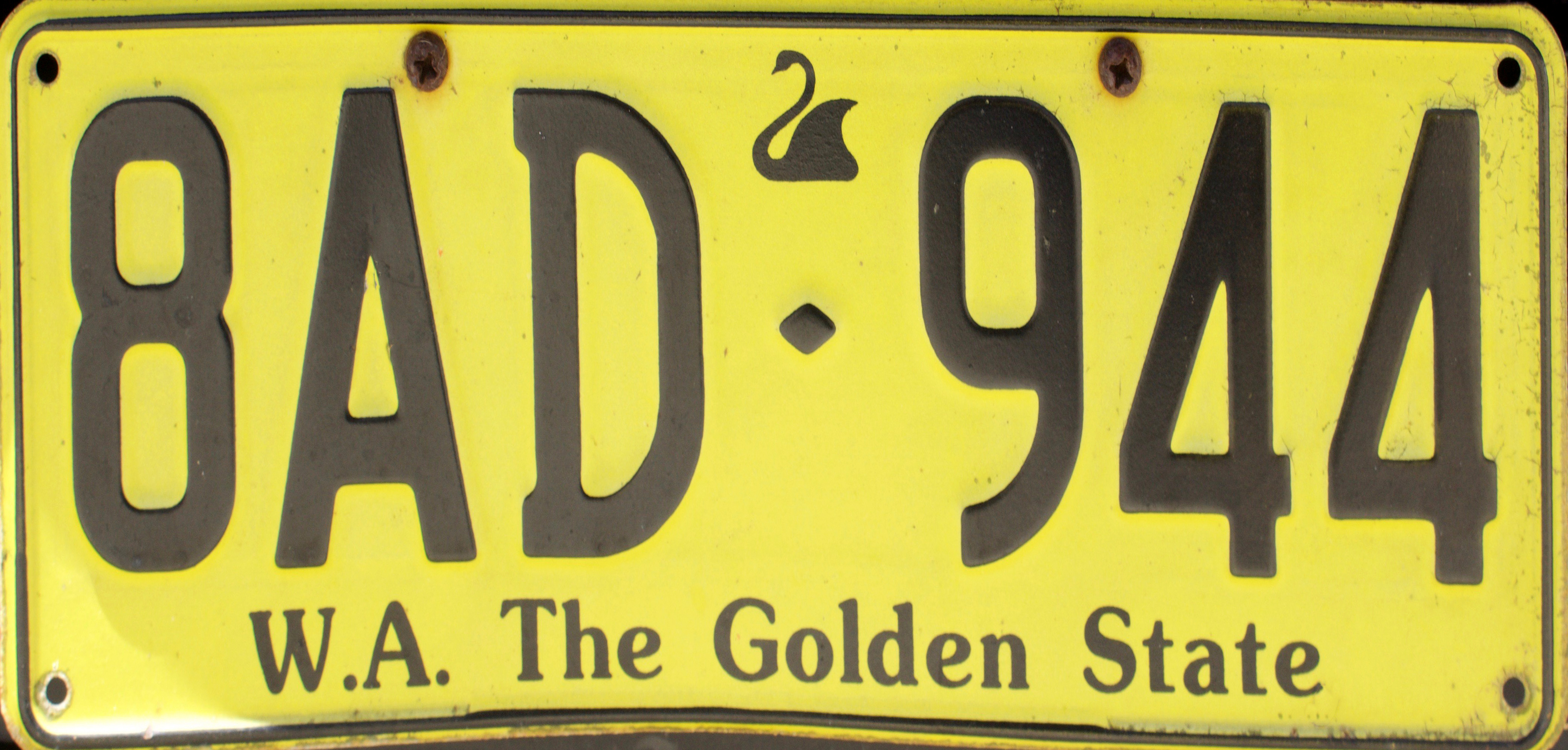
WA The Golden State

Optional

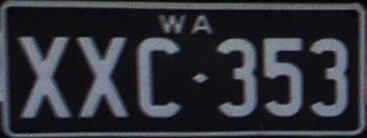
Retro

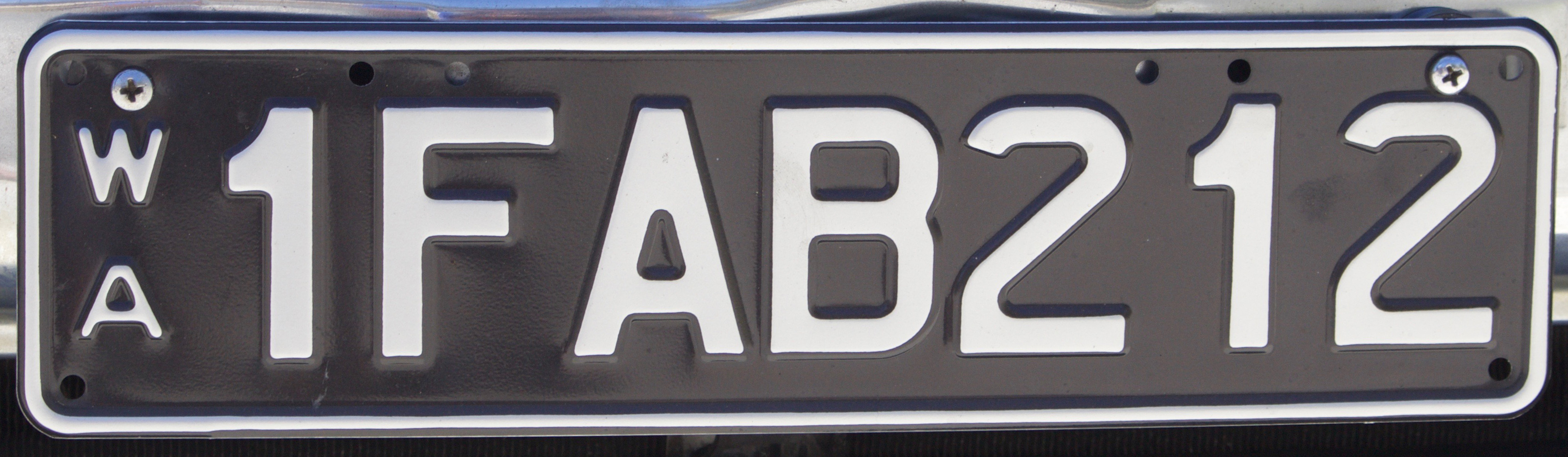
Platinum

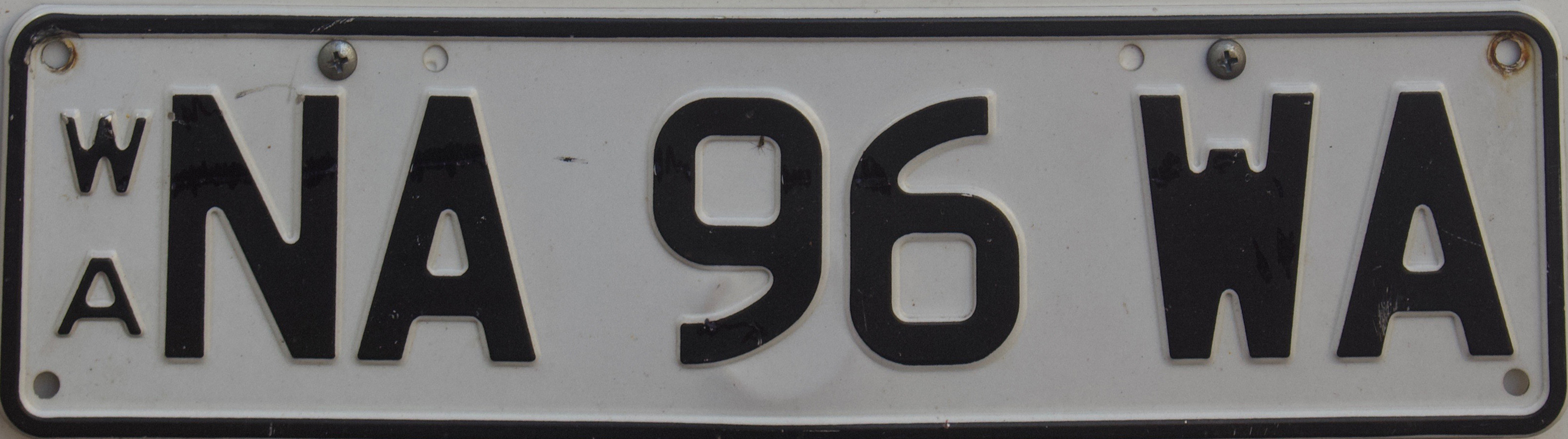
Prestige (white)

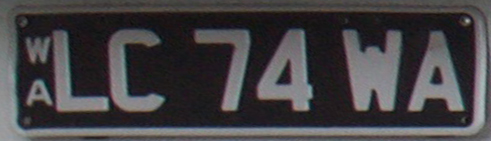
Prestige (black)

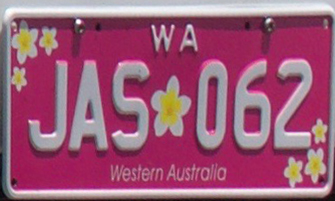
Frangipani

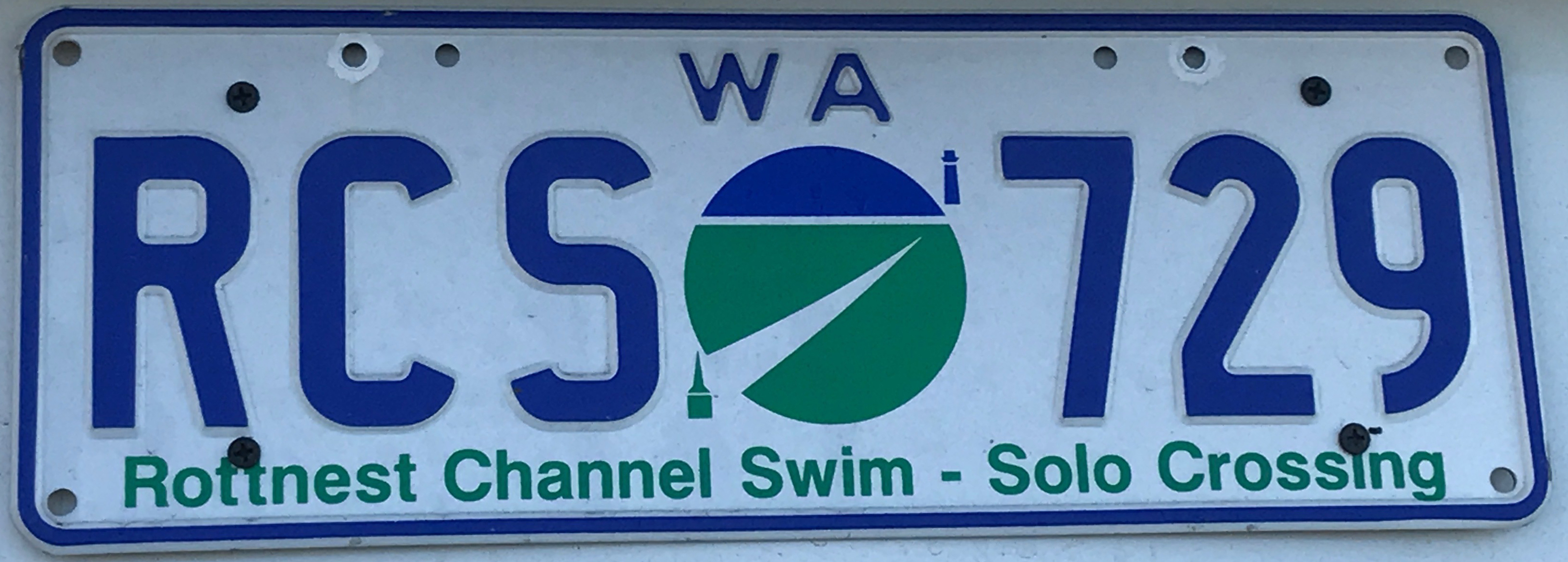
Rottnest Channel Swim

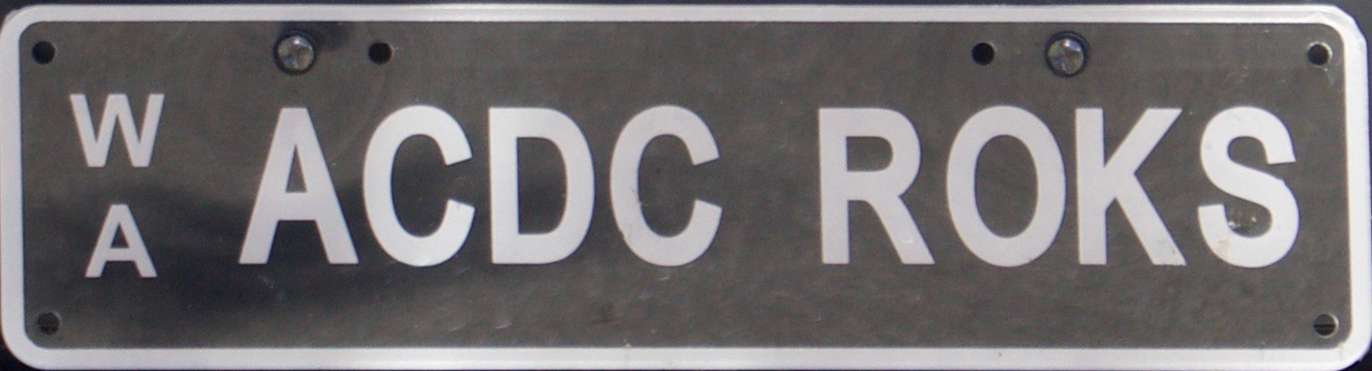
Custom Slimline

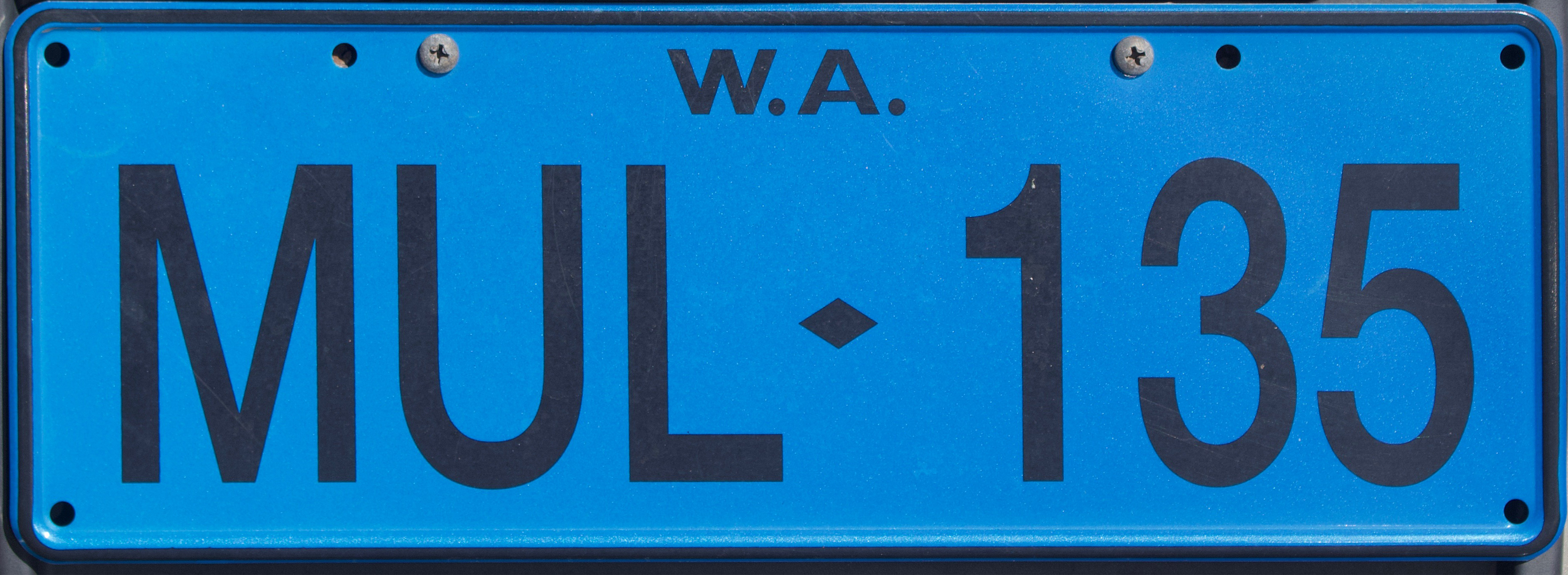
Personalised

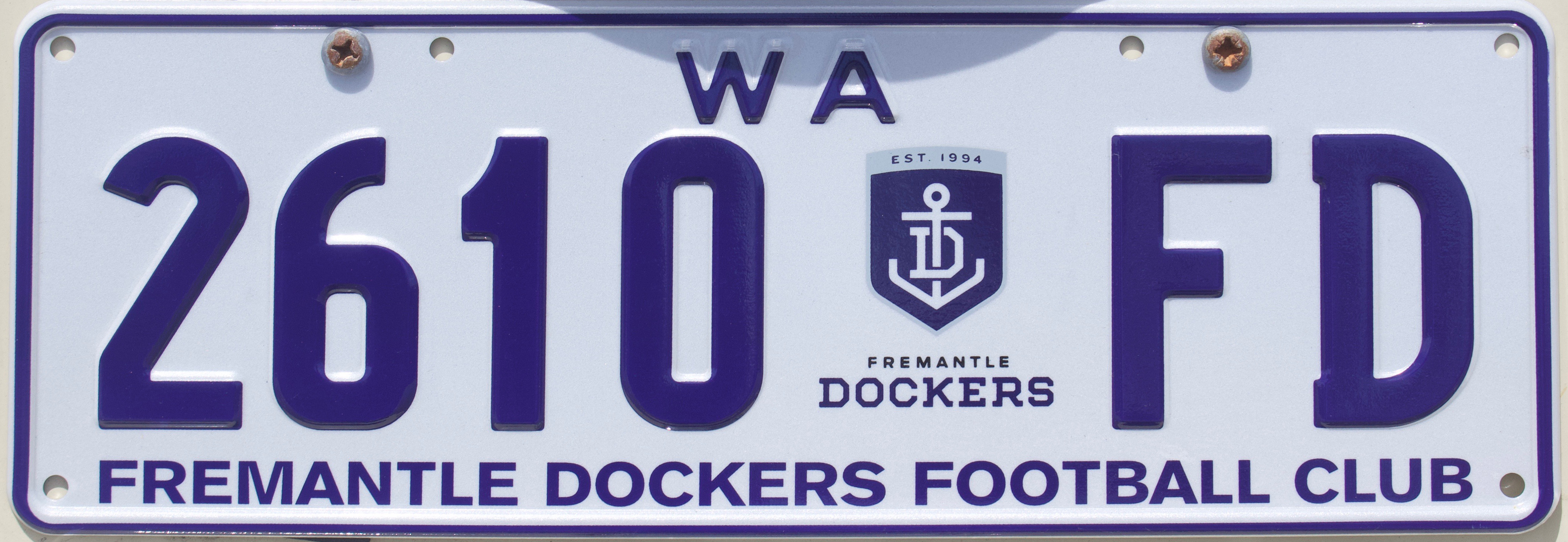
Sport team (Fremantle Dockers)

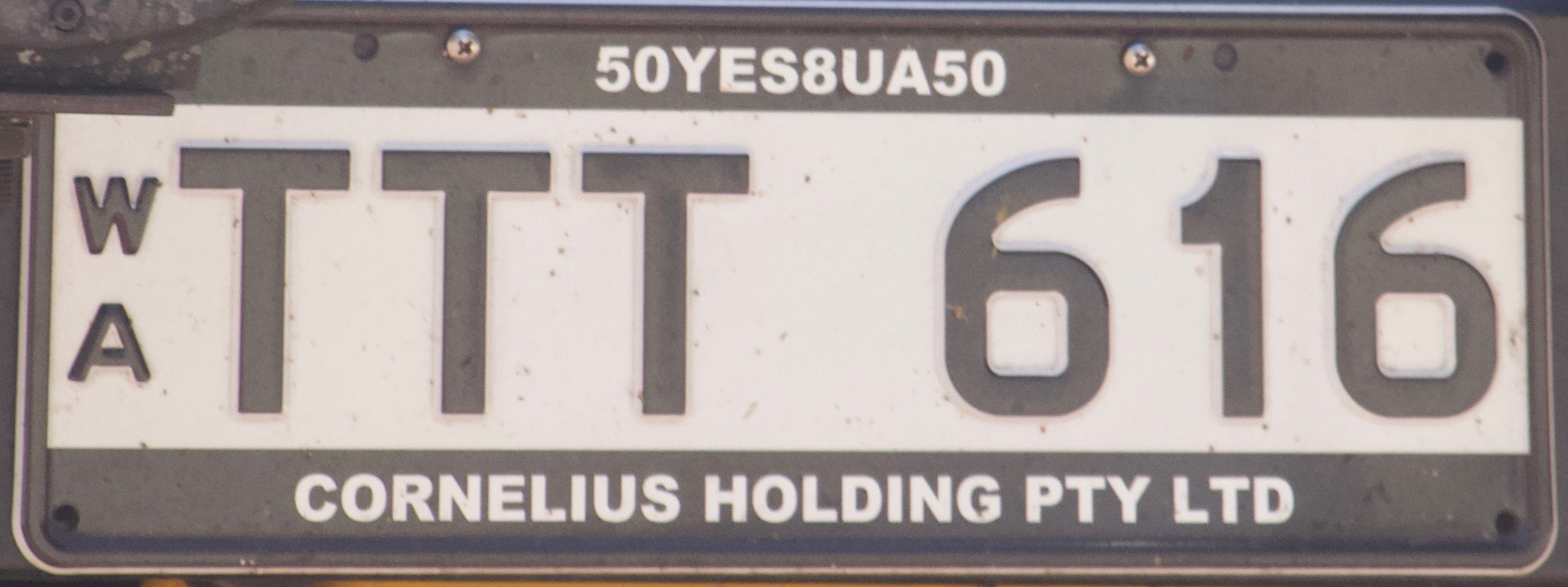
Biz series

Euro-style

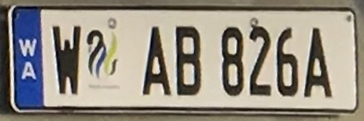
Euro standard

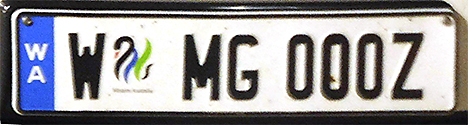
Euro Custom

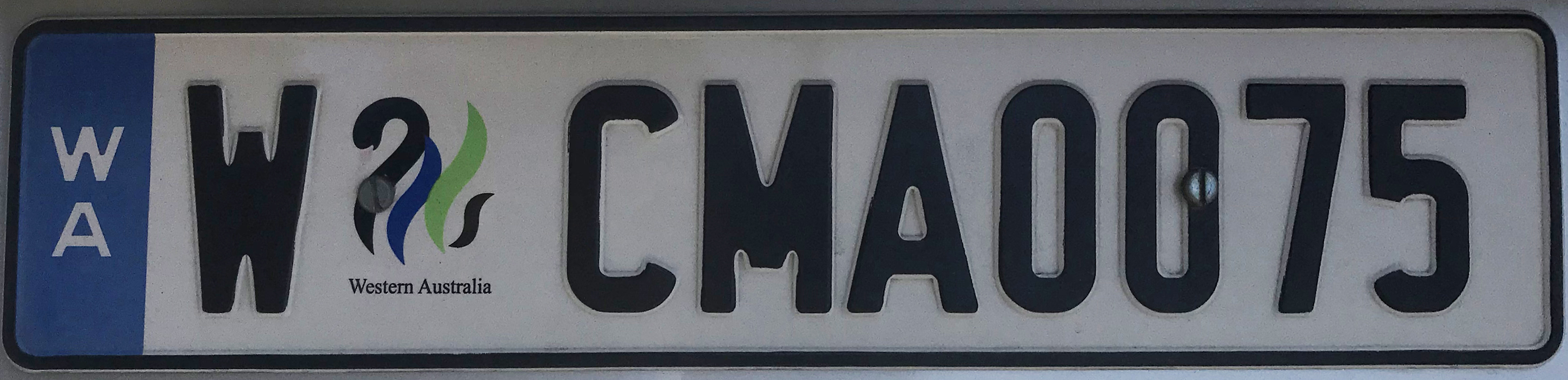
Euro Custom Plus

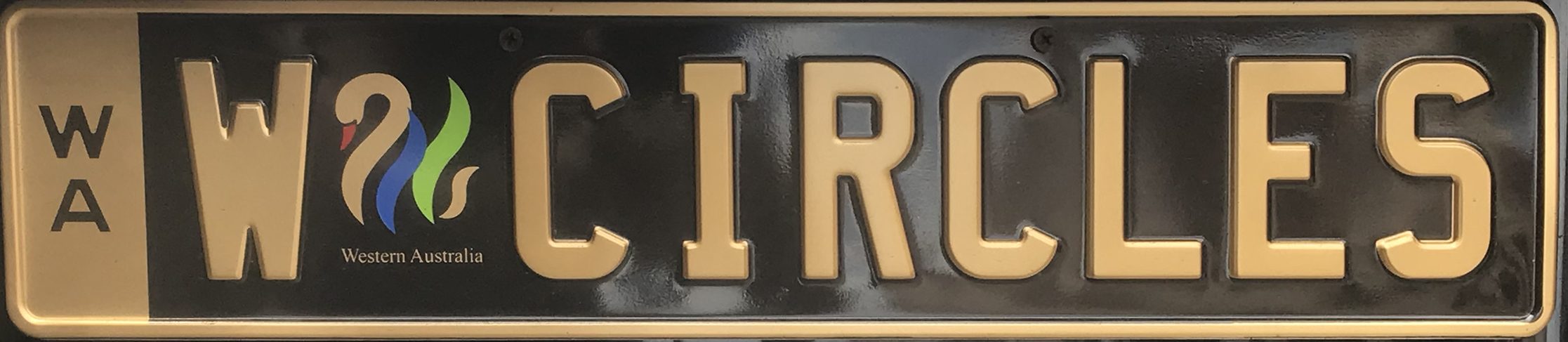
Euro Premium

== Withdrawn plates ==
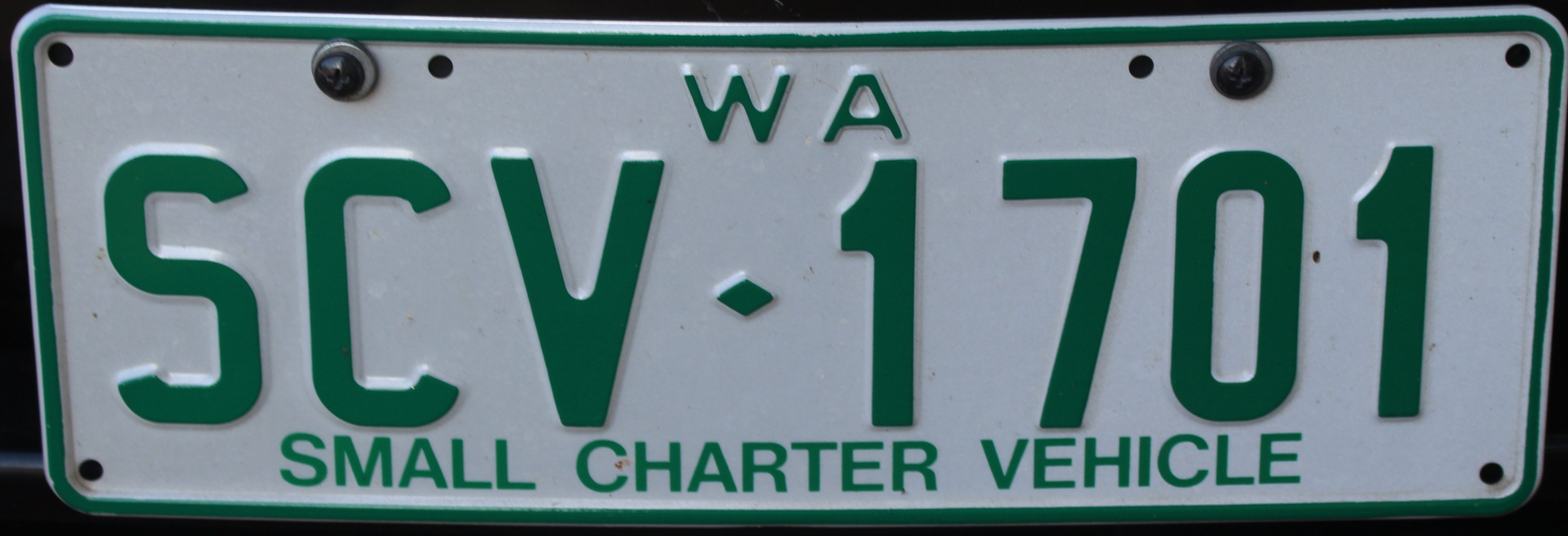
Small Charter Vehicle

Transperth UQB plate

Touring Coach

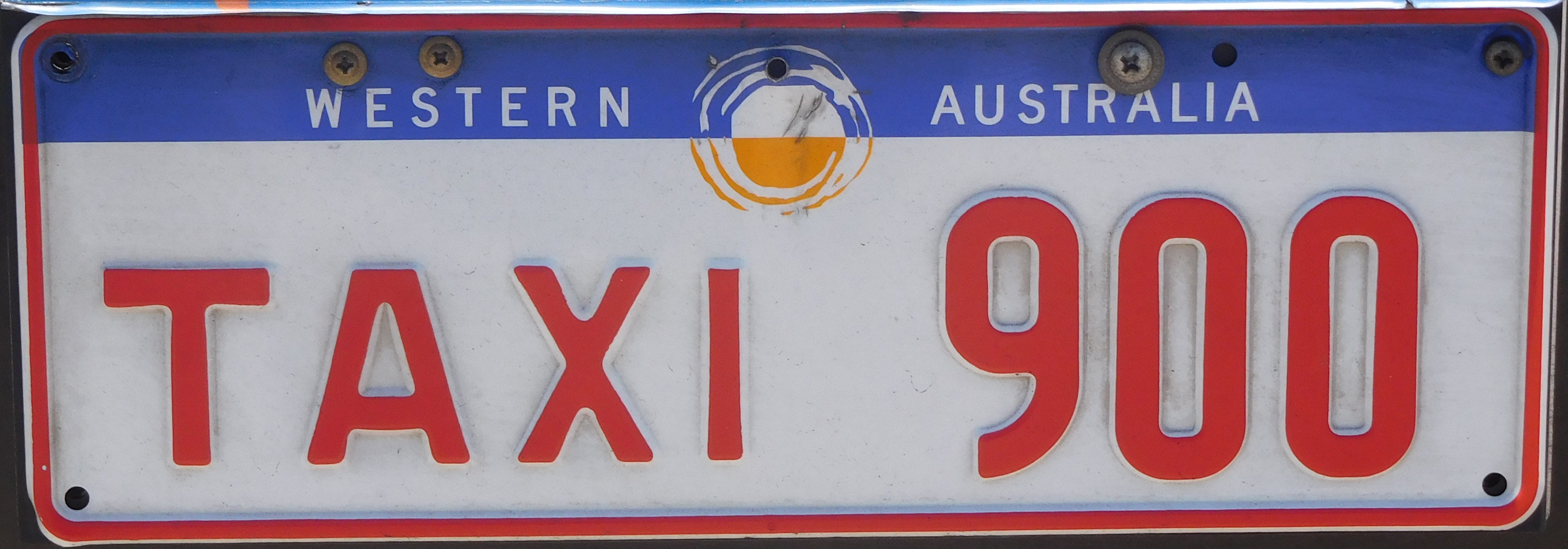
Taxi

Perth Central Area Transit plate

== Skipped Combinations ==
- Old General Series 1956–1997 (U, X,6–9)AB-123: UAQ, UAV, UBQ, UBV, up to UZQ, UZV, UVA–UVZ, XAQ, XAV, XBQ, XBV, up to XZQ, XZV, XVA–XVZ, 6AQ, 6AV, 6BQ, 6BV up to 9MQ, 9MV, 6VA–6VZ, 7VA–7VZ, 8VA–8VZ, 9NA–9QZ, 9RQ, 9RV, 9SA–9SS, 9SU-9ZZ.
- 1997 series: 1AQA-1AQZ, 1BQA-1BQZ, 1IIA-1IIZ.
