= List of heritage places in the Shire of Cranbrook =

List of heritage sites in Western Australia

The State Register of Heritage Places is maintained by the Heritage Council of Western Australia. As of 2026, 35 places are heritage-listed in the Shire of Cranbrook, of which one is on the State Register of Heritage Places, the Tenterden Agricultural Hall, a building destroyed by bush fire on 27 December 2003.

== List ==
=== State Register of Heritage Places ===
The Western Australian State Register of Heritage Places, as of 2026, lists the following state registered place within the Shire of Cranbrook:

Place name	Place #	Street number	Street name	Suburb or town	Co-ordinates	Notes & former names	Photo
Tenterden Agricultural Hall	3242	Corner	Gillam & Trimmer Streets	Tenterden	34.362196°S 117.554124°E		

=== Shire of Cranbrook heritage-listed places ===
The following places are heritage listed in the Shire of Cranbrook but are not State registered:

Place name	Place #	Street number	Street name	Suburb or town	Notes & former names	Photo
Bank of New South Wales (former)	604	23	Gathorne Street	Cranbrook	Bank of NSW, Westpac Bank	
Cranbrook Hotel	605	29	Gathorne Street	Cranbrook		
Road Board Office (former)	606		Gathorne Street	Cranbrook		
St Anne's Roman Catholic Church	607	22	Gordon Street	Cranbrook		
St Oswald's Anglican Church	608	17	Climie Street	Cranbrook		
Gordon River Hall	609		Shamrock Road	Cranbrook		
Travellers' Rest Inn Hotel (former)	610		Albany Highway	Tenterden	Yenmor Farm	
St Mildred's Anglican Church	613		Trimmer Street	Tenterden		
Burial Site on Rockwell Farm	6483		Rockwell Road	Cranbrook	Burial Site of Baby May Knowles	
CBH Blue Gum Tree	6484		Grantham Road	Cranbrook		
Drovers Dam	6485	Beside	Yeriminup Road	Cranbrook		
George Guessnor's Grave	6486		Northam Cranbrook Road	Cranbrook		
Nurse Kinsella's Grave	6487		Newton Road	Cranbrook		
Gravesites at Tenterden	6488			Tenterden	includes Henry Townsend's grave	
Jack Williams' Gravesite	6489		Near Nunijup Homestead, Lake Nunijup	Tenterden		
Newy Davis Homestead Ruins, Brooklyn Farm	6490		Brooklyn Road	Cranbrook		
Nunijup Homestead	6491		Nunijup	Tenterden	Jack William's Homestead	
Old Co-op Building	6492	21	Gathorne Street	Cranbrook	AC Gardiner Store	
Old Strainer Post	6493	300m South	Nunijup-Martigallup Road	Cranbrook		
Old Cranbrook Power House (former)	6494		Climie Street	Cranbrook	Cranbrook Motors	
Old Railway Dam	6495		Hardy Road	Cranbrook	Pump Dam	
Cranbrook Station Master's House	6496		Gathorne Street	Cranbrook	Cranbrook Museum	
Susannah Peacock's House	6497	27	Climie Street	Cranbrook		
Tunney Cricket Ground and Tennis Club	6498	Adjacent to	Albany Highway North at Tunney Road	Cranbrook		
White Gum Tree with Axe Marks	6499	off	Nunijup South Road	Tenterden		
Wonnenup Homestead	6500	Beside	Gordon River	Cranbrook		
Yeriminup Cemetery	6501		Yeriminup Road	Frankland		
Yeriminup Sheep Wash	6502		Hay Location 31	Cranbrook		
Yeriminup Homestead	6503		Yeriminup Road	Cranbrook		
Cranbrook War Memorial	15699		Gathorne Street	Cranbrook		
Frankland War Memorial	15700		Moir Street	Frankland		
Tenterden War Memorial	15701		Lunt Road	Tenterden		
Stirling Range National Park	16733					
Cranbrook Police Station	17439	130	Climie Street	Cranbrook		
