= Tablelands =

Tablelands or tableland may refer to:

== Places ==
=== Antarctica ===
- Chaplains Tableland

=== Australia ===
==== New South Wales ====
- Central Tablelands
- Northern Tablelands
- Southern Tablelands

==== Northern Territory ====
- Barkly Tableland
- Tablelands Highway
- Tablelands, Northern Territory

==== Queensland ====
- Atherton Tableland
- Blackdown Tableland National Park
- Electoral district of Tablelands
- Tablelands Advertiser
- Tablelands Folk Festival
- Tablelands, Queensland (Gladstone Region)
- Tablelands, Queensland (South Burnett Region)
- Tablelands railway line
- Tablelands Region, local government area
- Windsor Tablelands

==== Western Australia ====
- Hampton Tableland
- Shire of Tableland

=== Canada ===
- The Tablelands in Gros Morne National Park, Canada

=== Trinidad and Tobago ===
- Tableland, Trinidad and Tobago

=== Tunisia ===
- Jugurtha Tableland

=== USA ===
- Southwestern Tablelands

== See also ==
- Plateaus
- Tableland
