= Department for Planning and Infrastructure =

Former government department in Western Australia

Agency overview
- Formed: 1 July 2001
- Preceding agencies: Ministry for Planning; Department of Transport
- Dissolved: 30 June 2009
- Superseding agency: Department of Transport
- Jurisdiction: Government of Western Australia
- Agency executive: Reece Waldock, Director General
- Website: dpi.wa.gov.au

The Department for Planning and Infrastructure was a department of the Government of Western Australia that was responsible for implementing the state's planning, infrastructure and transport policies during the Gallop and Carpenter governments. It was formed on 1 July 2001 by the amalgamation of the Ministry for Planning and the Department of Transport.

It also oversaw the following authorities: -

- Western Australian Planning Commission
- Public Transport Authority

On 1 July 2009, the department was reformed into the new Department of Transport and Department of Planning, with State Land Services and Pastoral Leases being transferred to the newly formed Department of Regional Development and Lands.

== See also ==
- Planning and Development Act 2005
- Urban planning in Australia
