= Shire of Ashburton (1887–1972) =

Former local government in Western Australia

The original Shire of Ashburton was a local government area in Western Australia from 1887 to 1972. It was based in the town of Onslow.

It was established on 1 January 1887 as the Ashburton Road District.

It was declared a shire and named the Shire of Ashburton with effect from 1 July 1961 following the passage of the Local Government Act 1960, which reformed all remaining road districts into shires.

The shire absorbed Barrow Island, Double Island and Pasco Island from the Shire of Roebourne on 21 January 1966.

It was amalgamated with the Shire of Tableland to form the Shire of West Pilbara (later renamed Ashburton) on 27 May 1972.
