= Shire of Tambellup =

Former local government area in Western Australia

Coordinates: 34°02′28″S 117°38′31″E

- Local government area
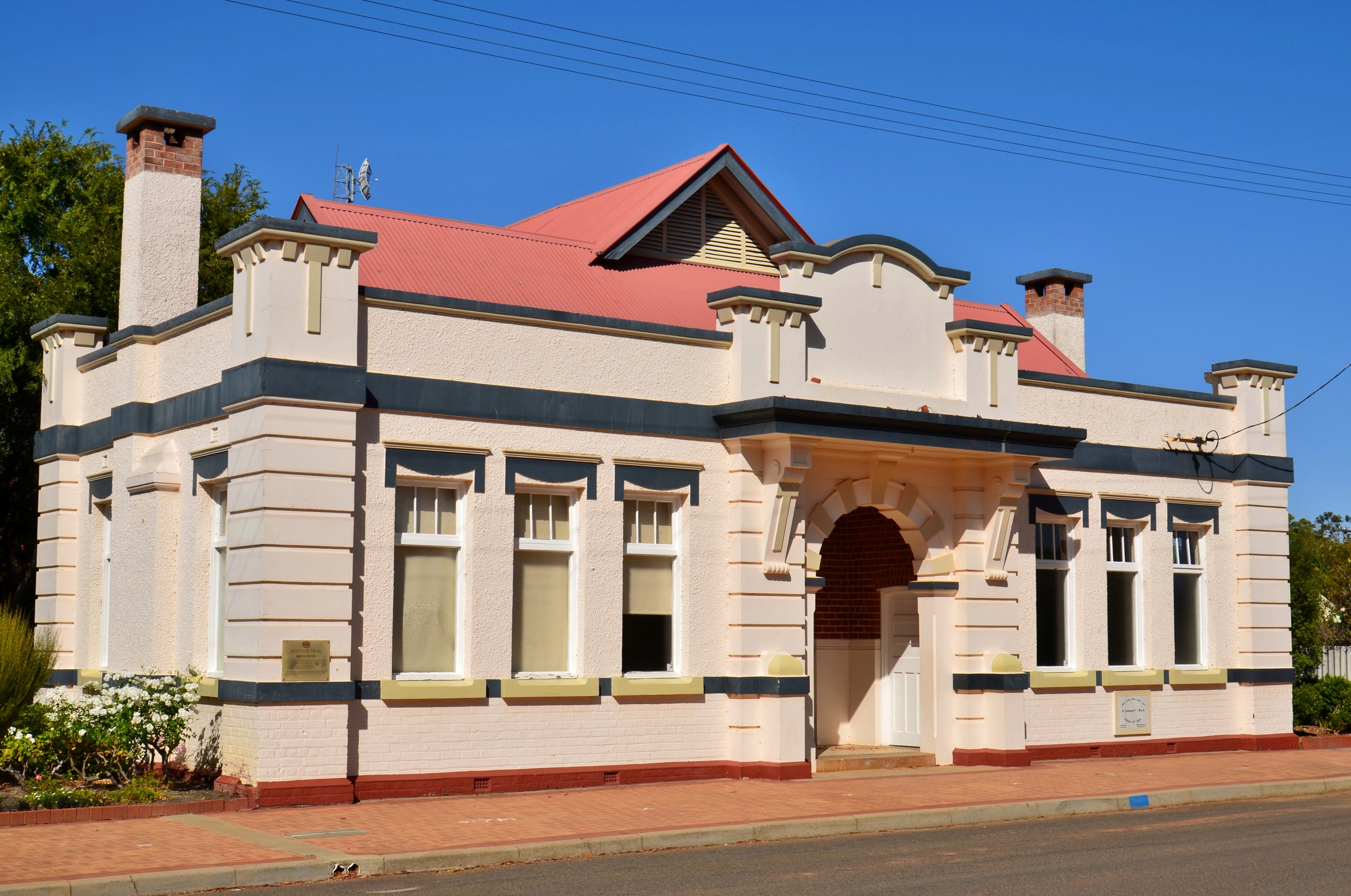
- Tambellup Shire Hall (2018)

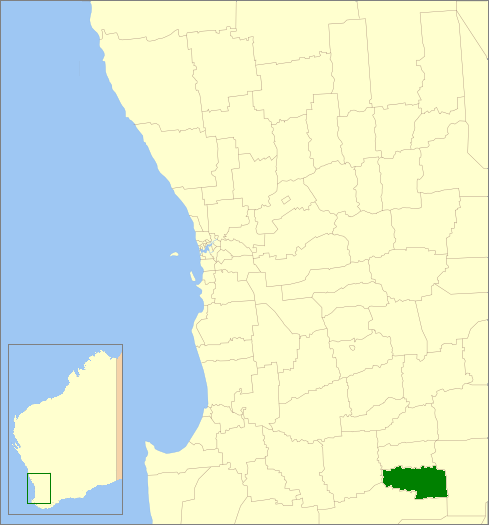
- Location in Western Australia
- Country: Australia
- State: Western Australia
- Region: Great Southern
- Established: 1905
- Council seat: Tambellup

Area
  - Total: 1,436.3 km^{2} (554.6 sq mi)

Population
  - Total: 659 (2006)
  - Density: 0.4588/km^{2} (1.1883/sq mi)
- Website: Shire of Tambellup
LGAs around Shire of Tambellup
Kojonup	Broomehill	Gnowangerup
Kojonup	Shire of Tambellup	Gnowangerup
Cranbrook	Cranbrook	Gnowangerup

The Shire of Tambellup was a local government area in the Great Southern region of Western Australia, about 40 kilometres (25 mi) south of Katanning and about 330 kilometres (205 mi) south-southeast of the state capital, Perth. The Shire covered an area of 1,436 square kilometres (554 sq mi), and its seat of government was the town of Tambellup.

The Tambellup Road District was gazetted on 13 October 1905. On 1 July 1961, it became a shire council following the enactment of the Local Government Act 1960, which reformed all remaining road districts into shires. On 1 July 2008, after 10 months of planning and preparation, it merged with the neighbouring Shire of Broomehill to form the Shire of Broomehill-Tambellup.

== Wards ==
The shire was divided into 3 wards:

- Stirling Ward (3 councillors)
- Toolbrunup Ward (3 councillors)
- Warrenup Ward (3 councillors)

== Towns and localities ==
- Tambellup
- Bobalong
- Borderdale
- Dartnall
- Lake Toolbrunup
- Moonies Hill
- Tunney
- Wansbrough
