= Shire of Broomehill =

Former local government area in Australia

Coordinates: 33°50′42″S 117°38′02″E

- Local government area
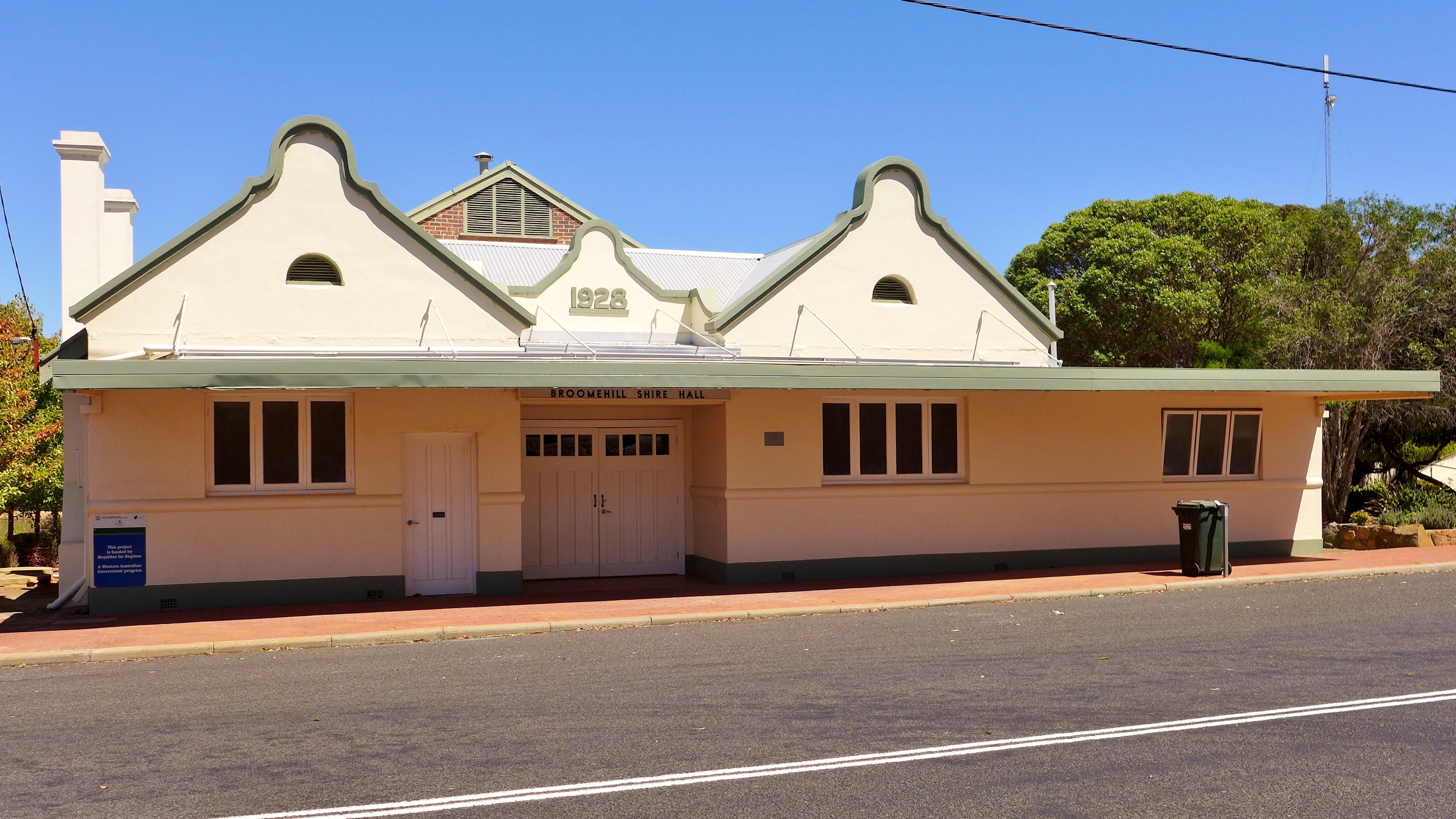
- Broomehill Shire Hall (in 2018)
- Country: Australia
- State: Western Australia
- Region: Great Southern
- Established: 1892
- Council seat: Broomehill

Area
  - Total: 1,172.8 km^{2} (452.8 sq mi)

Population
  - Total(s): 478 (2006)
  - Density: 0.4076/km^{2} (1.0556/sq mi)
LGAs around Shire of Broomehill
Katanning	Katanning	Kent
Kojonup	Shire of Broomehill	Gnowangerup
Kojonup	Tambellup	Gnowangerup

The Shire of Broomehill was a local government area in the Great Southern region of Western Australia, about 20 kilometres (12 mi) south of Katanning and about 310 kilometres (193 mi) south-southeast of the state capital, Perth. The Shire covered an area of 1,173 square kilometres (453 sq mi), and its seat of government was the town of Broomehill.

== History ==
The Broomehill Road District was gazetted on 19 May 1892. On 1 July 1961, it became a shire following changes to the Local Government Act which reformed all remaining road boards into shires. On 1 July 2008, after ten months of planning and preparation, it merged with the neighbouring Shire of Tambellup to form the Shire of Broomehill-Tambellup.

== Wards ==
The shire was originally divided into wards, but as at 2007, it was a single electorate with eight representative councillors.

== Towns and localities ==
- Broomehill
- Peringillup
