= Department of Transport and Major Infrastructure =

Agency overview
- Formed: 1 July 2025
- Preceding agency: Department of Transport
- Jurisdiction: Western Australia
- Headquarters: 140 William Street, Perth
- Agency executive: Peter Woronzow, Director General
- Child agencies: Main Roads Western Australia; Public Transport Authority
- Website: transport.wa.gov.au

The Department of Transport and Major Infrastructure (DTMI) is a department of the Government of Western Australia. It was formed on 1 July 2025 by the Cook government taking over the responsibilities of the Department of Transport with additional functions from the Department of Finance and Department of Health.
