= Department of Transport (Western Australia) =

Department of the Government of Western Australia

Agency overview
- Formed: 1 July 2009
- Preceding agencies: Department of Planning and Major Infrastructure; Department of Transport
- Dissolved: 30 June 2025
- Superseding agency: Department of Transport & Major Infrastructure
- Jurisdiction: Government of Western Australia
- Minister responsible: Rita Saffioti, Minister for Transport
- Agency executive: Peter Woronzow, Director General
- Website: transport.wa.gov.au

The Department of Transport was a department of the Government of Western Australia that was responsible for implementing the state's vehicle licensing, maritime safety, taxi, ports, transport policies. It was formed on 1 July 2009.

It was one of three agencies reporting to the same Director General. The two other transport agencies were:

- Public Transport Authority
- Main Roads Western Australia

On 1 July 2009, the State Land Services and Pastoral Leases being transferred to the newly formed Department of Regional Development and Lands.

On 1 July 2025, it was superseded by the Department of Transport & Major Infrastructure that took on additional responsibilities from the Department of Finance and Department of Health.

== Directors General ==
The head of the Department of Transport is the Director General, who was responsible to the Public Sector Commissioner and the Director General of the Department of the Premier & Cabinet.

- Menno Henneveld (Acting) (1 July 2009 – 3 May 2010)
- Reece Waldock (3 May 2010 – 29 July 2016)
- Richard Sellers (29 July 2016 – March 2020)
