= Main Roads Western Australia =

Government agency in Western Australia

Agency overview
- Formed: 1 January 1930
- Preceding agency: Main Roads Board
- Jurisdiction: Government of Western Australia
- Headquarters: Don Aitken Centre
- Employees: 1,237 (2021)
- Annual budget: A$2.2B (2020/21)
- Minister responsible: Rita Saffioti
- Agency executive: Peter Woronzow, Director General
- Parent agency: Department of Transport & Major Infrastructure
- Website: mainroads.wa.gov.au

Main Roads Western Australia (formerly the Main Roads Department) is a statutory authority of the Government of Western Australia that is responsible for implementing the state's policies on road access and main roads. It operates under the Main Roads Act 1930 (WA).

As of June 2021, it manages 18,695 kilometres (11,617 mi) of roads, representing the arterial road network in Western Australia. Each of the roads must be declared a "public highway" or "main road" in the Western Australian Government Gazette and is allocated a highway or main road number – many roads perceived as main roads by the public are in fact managed by local councils.

Main Roads Western Australia also regulates heavy vehicles through the issue of permits and notices under the authority granted to the Commissioner of Main Roads under the Road Traffic Act 1974. The Road Transport Compliance Section, a section within the department, employs transport inspectors who, alongside police officers, monitor heavy vehicle movement and enforce the Road Traffic Act 1974.

== History ==
=== Establishment ===
The first roads in Western Australia were built during the settlement of the Swan River Colony in the late 1820s. Prior to this, narrow bush tracks had been used by the local Aboriginal people. By the District Roads Act 1871 (34 Vict. No. 26), local governments were established, often called 'road boards' in rural areas. Their primary function was to create and maintain the roads network in their local areas. Most of these rural roads, especially in the Wheatbelt, connected farms to the state government's extensive rail network, usually covering a distance of less than 32 kilometres (20 mi). By the end of World War I, technology such as the internal combustion engine had advanced considerably. Following the war, there was a tenfold increase in the number of motor vehicles in Western Australia, from 2,538 in 1918 to 25,270 in 1927. Motor transport was very efficient compared to horse-drawn vehicles, and also more efficient than railways for short distances.

In 1923, recognising the importance of road transportation, the federal government began granting a combined total of £500,000, equivalent to A$45.5 million in 2022, per year to the state governments for road improvement works.

In 1926, the funding level was increased, with Western Australia allocated £672,000, equivalent to A$108.8 million in 2022. The Roads and Bridges Branch of the state government's Public Works Department was not able to spend such a large amount of money, so a Main Roads Board was established in July 1926. The board worked in cooperation with local governments, taking over the development of significant roads, and providing assistance for others. District offices were set up in regional areas to better coordinate work undertaken there, and liaise with those local governments.

=== 20th century ===
The Great Depression, which started in 1929, brought chaos into the new system. The board was dissolved, and replaced by a Commissioner of Main Roads, the first of which was Edward Tindale. All the district offices were closed down, with the workers laid off. The number of staff in Perth was reduced from 107 to 41, and salaries were also lowered.

The Main Roads Act 1930 came into effect and re-established the board as the Main Roads Department. Main Roads was able to provide work for the unemployed throughout the 1930s in road construction. Large groups of men spent one or two weeks in camps, constructing roads. With the outbreak of World War II in 1939, a smaller labour force undertook works for Main Roads, which were primarily for military purposes, such as aerodromes and parade grounds. The late 1940s were a boom-time for Main Roads. Government funding and support increased, and new equipment such as power graders, front-end loaders, and large trucks allowed work to be undertaken more efficiently. The amount of work meant there was a high demand for workers – the re-established regional divisions became employment hubs for European migrants.

=== 21st century ===
In 2022, the Cook government began to bring road maintenance back under the control of MRWA after it was outsourced in the 1990s. The project was completed in November 2024.

== Commissioners ==
The head of Main Roads WA is the Commissioner. Since 2010 the role of Commissioner of Main Roads has been part of the role of the Director General for the Transport Portfolio, who also oversees the Public Transport Authority and Department of Transport.

- Edward Tindale (1930 – February 1941)
- Jim Young (February 1941 – 18 January 1953)
- Digby Leach (18 January 1953 – January 1964)
- John Punch (1964–1965)
- Don Aitken (April 1965 – October 1987)
- Albert Tognolini (8 December 1987 – 7 December 1990)
- Ken Michael (1991 – August 1997)
- Ross Drabble (August 1997 – 10 February 1999)
- Greg Martin (10 February 1999 – 2002)
- Menno Henneveld (December 2002 – May 2010)
- Reece Waldock (May 2010 – July 2016)
- Richard Sellers (July 2016 – March 2020)
- Peter Woronzow (March 2020 – present)
