= Reece Waldock =

Australian public servant

- Education: Curtin University
- Occupation: Public servant

Reece Waldock is a retired senior Australian public servant. Most recently he served concurrently as Director-General of the WA Department of Transport, Commissioner of Main Roads Western Australia and CEO of the WA Public Transport Authority, between May 2010 and July 2016.

== Life and career ==
In the early years of his career, Waldock worked for BHP. He studied metallurgy at Curtin University on a BHP scholarship, before moving to Australia's east for work. He returned to Western Australia in the mid-1980s.

Waldock was appointed to a senior executive position in the WA public service in the early 1990s, including in the Department of Commerce and Trade and the Department of Transport. In December 2000, he acted as Commissioner of Western Australian Government Railways Commission, following the sale of the rail freight business component of Westrail.

From July 2003 to July 2016, Waldock was Chief Executive Officer of the Public Transport Authority, responsible for a major construction program and for integrating statewide public transport services. In 2010, his role was expanded when he was appointed to serve a five-year term as Director-General of the WA Department of Transport, Commissioner of Main Roads Western Australia and CEO of the Public Transport Authority, concurrently. The integration of two new roles with his ongoing Public Transport Authority role was intended to improve transport planning, policy and budgeting. He was tasked with shaping the strategic direction of transport in the state.

In April 2015, Waldock was reappointed as head of the three key WA transport agencies to 29 July 2016 upon which he retired.

Waldock is a Director of Lifeline WA, Leadership WA, and the Australian Urban Design Research Centre.

Government offices
New title Agency established	Chief Executive Officer of the Public Transport Authority; 2003 – 2016	Succeeded by Richard Sellers
Preceded by Menno Henneveld (Acting)	Commissioner of Main Roads WA and Director General of the Department of Transport; 2010 – 2016	Succeeded by Richard Sellers
