= Shire of Tableland =

Former local government area in Western Australia

The Shire of Tableland was a local government area in the Pilbara region of Western Australia.

It was based in the Hamersley Range and had an office at Tambrey Station until the 1940s, met at Coolawanyah Station in the late 1940s, and met at Wittenoom from the 1950s.

It was established as the Tableland Road District on 3 January 1896.

It was declared a shire and named the Shire of Tableland with effect from 1 July 1961 following the passage of the Local Government Act 1960, which reformed all remaining road districts into shires.

It amalgamated with the original Shire of Ashburton to form the Shire of West Pilbara (later renamed Ashburton) on 27 May 1972.
