= Department of Finance (Western Australia) =

Western Australian government department

Department overview
- Formed: 1 July 2011
- Preceding Department: Department of Treasury & Finance
- Dissolved: 30 June 2025
- Superseding Department: Department of Housing & Works
- Jurisdiction: Government of Western Australia
- Headquarters: Djookanup, 16 Parkland Road, Osborne Park
- Minister responsible: Sue Ellery, Minister for Finance
- Department executive: Jodi Cant, Director General
- Website: www.wa.gov.au/organisation/department-of-finance

The Department of Finance was a department of the Government of Western Australia.

The department was formed on 1 July 2011 from the Department of Treasury & Finance. It is responsible for the construction and maintenance of government buildings, management of major Western Australian state projects, government procurement, administration of revenue and the grant and subsidy schemes.

The department was one of the few that remained mostly unaffected by the 2017 restructuring of the Western Australian government departments, which resulted in the number of departments being reduced from 41 to 25.

On 1 July 2025, it became the Department of Housing & Works with some of its functions taken over by the Department of Treasury & Finance. It took over others from the Department of Communities.
