= Tenterden, Western Australia =

Tenterden
- Town
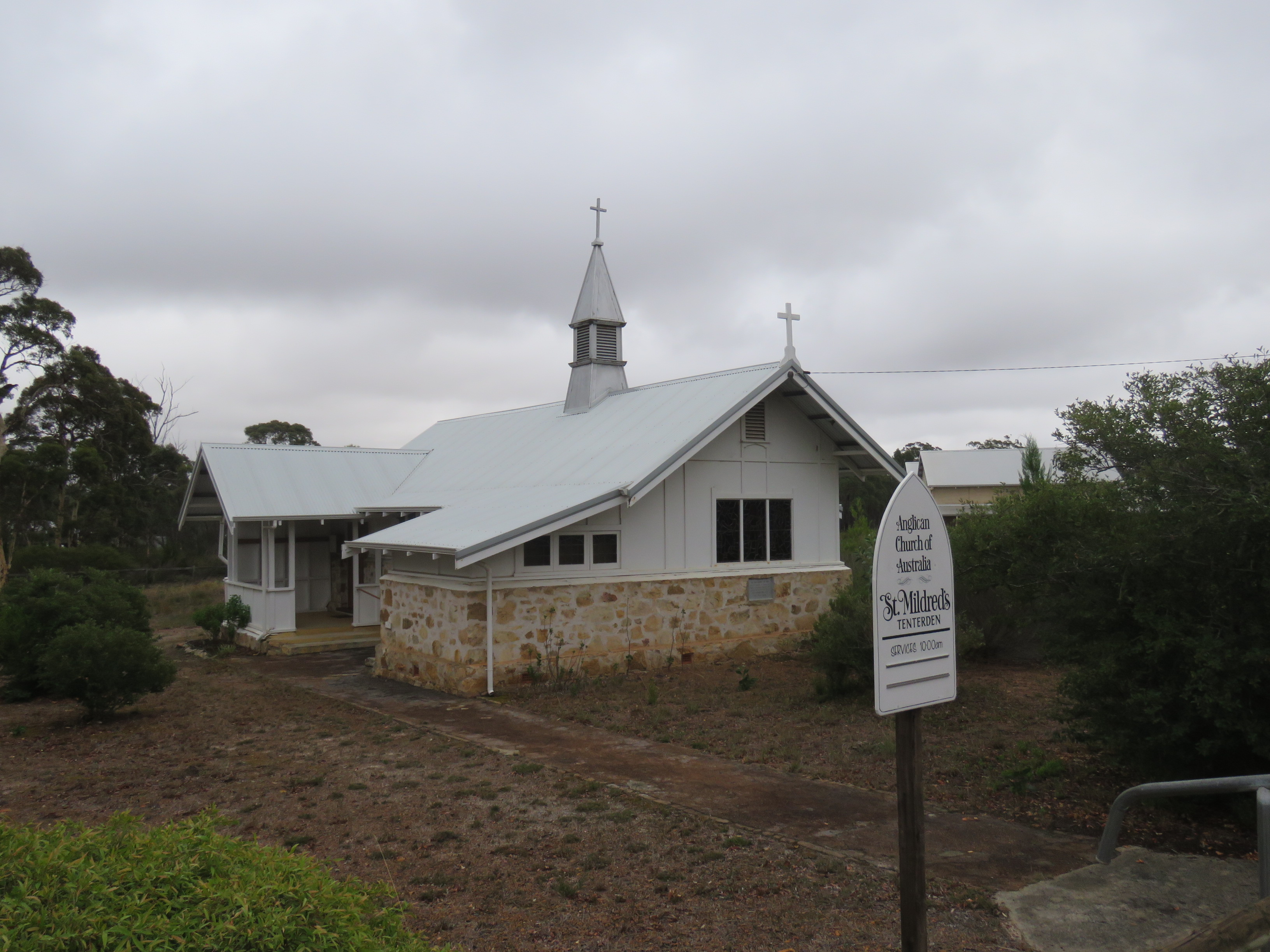
- The heritage listed St Mildred's Anglican Church in Tenterden in 2021

- Interactive map of Tenterden
- Coordinates: 34°22′00″S 117°33′00″E
- Country: Australia
- State: Western Australia
- LGA: Cranbrook
- Location: 328 km (204 mi) south east of Perth; 88 km (55 mi) north west of Albany; 11 km (6.8 mi) south of Cranbrook
- Established: 1893

Government
  - State electorate: Roe
  - Federal division: O'Connor

Area
  - Total: 414.5 km^{2} (160.0 sq mi)
- Elevation: 311 m (1,020 ft)

Population
  - Total: 240 (SAL 2021)
- Postcode: 6322

Tenterden is a town and locality located 328 km south-east of Perth in the Shire of Cranbrook in the Great Southern region of Western Australia. The townsite is located on one of the sidings on the Great Southern Railway line. The siding was established in 1891 and shortly afterward the government made land available for agricultural purposes in the area. The town was gazetted in 1893 and is named after a town in Kent.

== 2003 Fire ==
On 27 December 2003, two live power lines clashed and shorted out resulting in a large bushfire. Two local women died in the fire. Crop, property and stock damage was estimated to be in the millions of dollars. In December 2005, Western Power was fined $17,500 by a magistrate, having been taken to court by the Office of Energy Safety for failing to maintain a safe power network.
