= Shire of Cranbrook =

Coordinates: 34°17′49″S 117°33′14″E

- Local government area
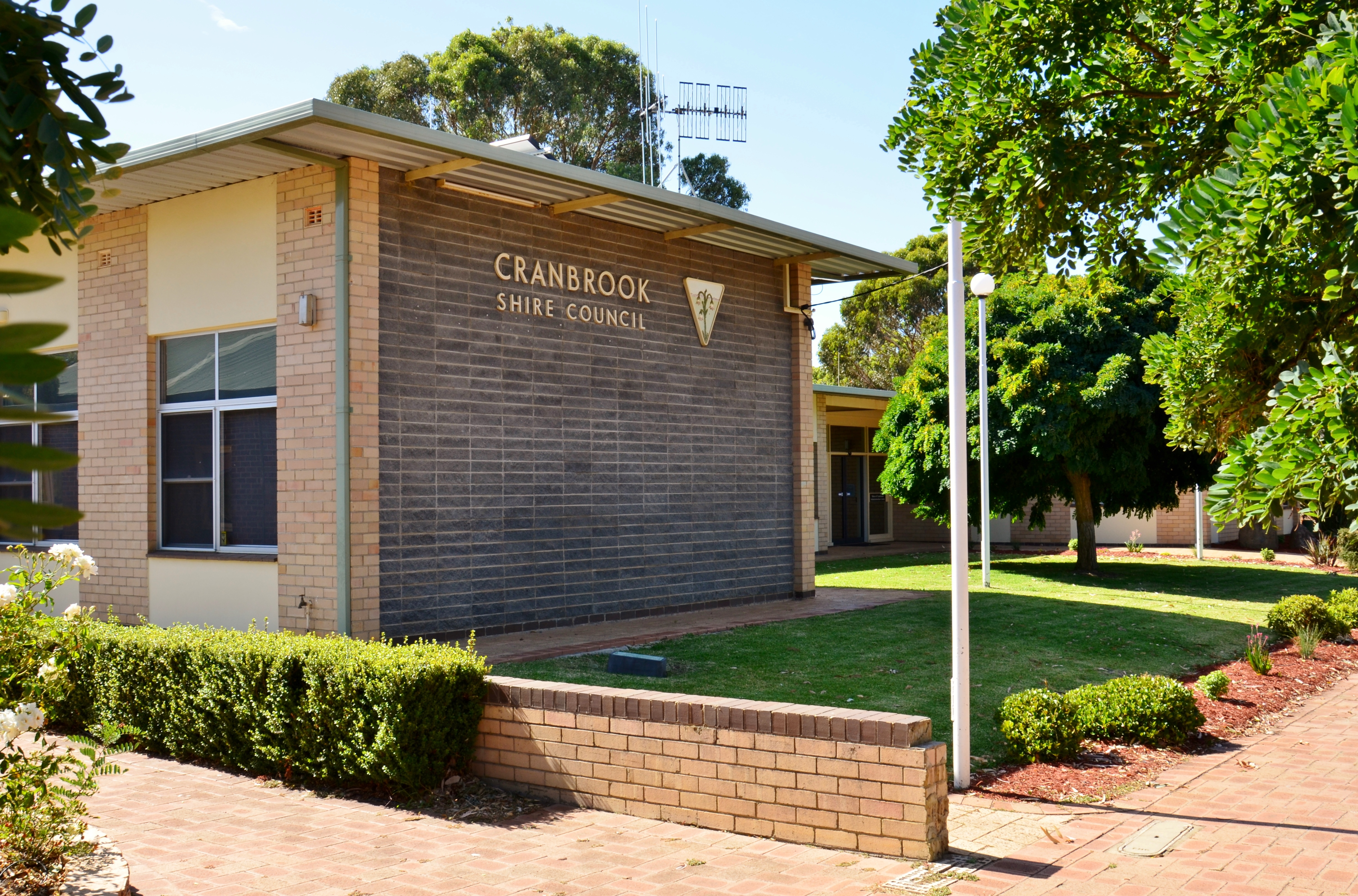
- Cranbrook shire offices, 2018

- Interactive map of Shire of Cranbrook
- Country: Australia
- State: Western Australia
- Region: Great Southern
- Established: 1926
- Council seat: Cranbrook

Government
  - Shire President: Perin Mulcahy
  - State electorate: Roe
  - Federal division: O'Connor

Area
  - Total: 3,276.8 km^{2} (1,265.2 sq mi)

Population
  - Total: 1,100 (LGA 2021)
- Website: Shire of Cranbrook
LGAs around Shire of Cranbrook
Boyup Brook	Kojonup	Broomehill-Tambellup
Manjimup	Shire of Cranbrook	Gnowangerup
Manjimup	Plantagenet	Plantagenet

The Shire of Cranbrook is a local government area in the Great Southern region of Western Australia, about 92 kilometres (57 mi) north of Albany and about 320 kilometres (200 mi) south-southeast of the state capital, Perth. The Shire covers an area of 3,277 square kilometres (1,265 sq mi), and its seat of government is the town of Cranbrook.

== History ==
The Cranbrook Road District was gazetted on 14 May 1926 out of parts of the Plantagenet and Tambellup road districts.

On 1 July 1961, it became a Shire following changes to the Local Government Act, which reformed all remaining road boards into shires.

== Indigenous people ==
The majority of the Shire of Cranbrook is located on the traditional land of the Kaniyang people of the Noongar nation. The far eastern part of the shire, east of Cranbrook itself, is located on the traditional lands of the Koreng people, also of the Noongar nation.

== Wards ==
The shire is divided into 3 wards, each with 3 councillors:

- East Ward
- Central Ward
- West Ward

== Towns and localities ==
The towns and localities of the Shire of Cranbrook with population and size figures based on the most recent Australian census:

Locality	Population	Area	Map
Cranbrook	505 (SAL 2021)	1,206.7 km^{2} (465.9 sq mi)	
Frankland River	353 (SAL 2021)	1,391.9 km^{2} (537.4 sq mi)	
Stirling Range National Park * ‡	0 (SAL 2021)	1,121 km^{2} (433 sq mi)	
Tenterden	240 (SAL 2021)	414.5 km^{2} (160.0 sq mi)	

- ( * indicates locality is only partially located within this shire)
- ( ‡ indicates boundaries of national park and locality are not identical)

== Heritage-listed places ==
As of 2023, 35 places are heritage-listed in the Shire of Cranbrook, of which one is on the State Register of Heritage Places, the Tenterden Agricultural Hall, a building destroyed by bush fire on 27 December 2003.
